= Early Gothic architecture =

Architectural style in France and England

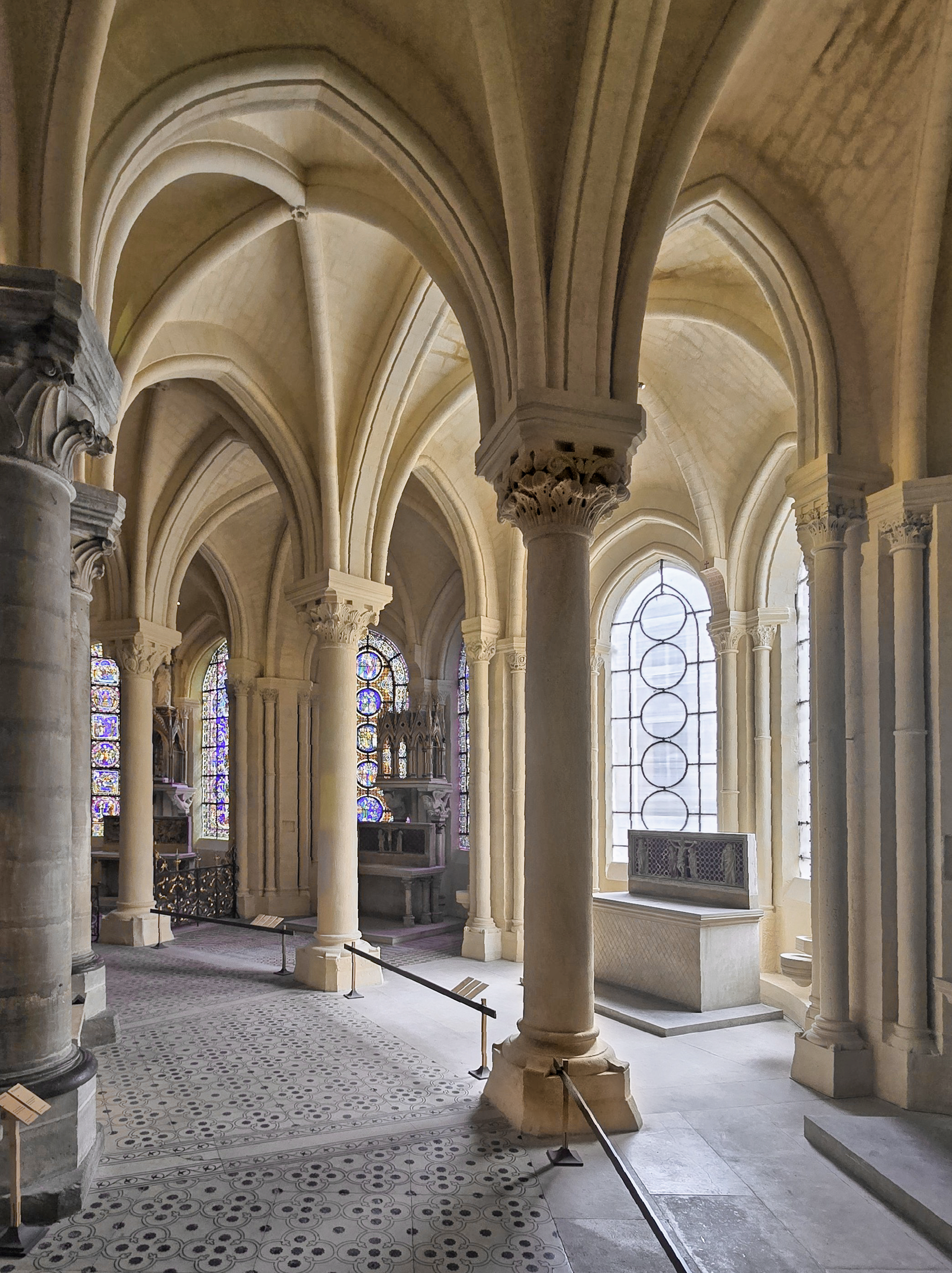
- Ambulatory of the Basilica of Saint-Denis
- Years active: c. 1129-1200
- Location: France, England, Germany

Early Gothic is the term for the first period of Gothic architecture which lasted from the 1130s until about 1200. The early Gothic builders used innovative technologies to resolve the problem of masonry ceilings which were too heavy for the traditional arched barrel vault. The solutions to the problem came in the form of the rib vault, where thin stone ribs passed the weight of the ceiling to rows of columns and outside the walls to another innovation, the flying buttress.

Gothic appeared in the Île-de-France region of France, around Paris, and spread quickly to other regions, and to England and Germany. It combined several existing technologies, notably the rib vault, pointed arch, flying buttress, to build much higher and thinner walls, which allowed more space for stained glass windows and more light in the interior.

Early examples of Early Gothic include the east end, chapels and ambulatory of the Abbey of Saint Denis in Paris, (1135-1144). The style soon spread from the Paris region to other parts of France, and then to England. Notable examples of early English Gothic include the Trinity Chapel of Canterbury Cathedral, built under the supervision of William of Sens, who had worked on Sens Cathedral, an early example of early French Gothic architecture.

== History ==
Early Gothic architecture was the result of the emergence in the 12th century of a powerful French state centered in the Île-de-France. King Louis VI of France (1081–1137), had succeeded, after a long struggle, in bringing the barons of northern France under his control, and successfully defended his domain against attacks by the English king, Henry I of England (1100–1135). Under Louis and his successors, cathedrals were the most visible symbol of the unity of the French church and state. During the reign of Louis VI of France (1081–1137), Paris was the principal residence of the kings of France. During the Carolingian era, Reims Cathedral was the place of coronation, and the Abbey of Saint-Denis became the ceremonial royal burial place. The king and his successors lavishly supported the construction and enlargement of abbeys and cathedrals.

The Abbot of Saint-Denis, Suger, was not only a prominent religious figure but also first minister to Louis VI and Louis VII. He oversaw the royal administration when the king was absent on the Crusades. He commissioned the reconstruction of the Basilica of Saint-Denis, making it the first and most influential example of the new style in France.

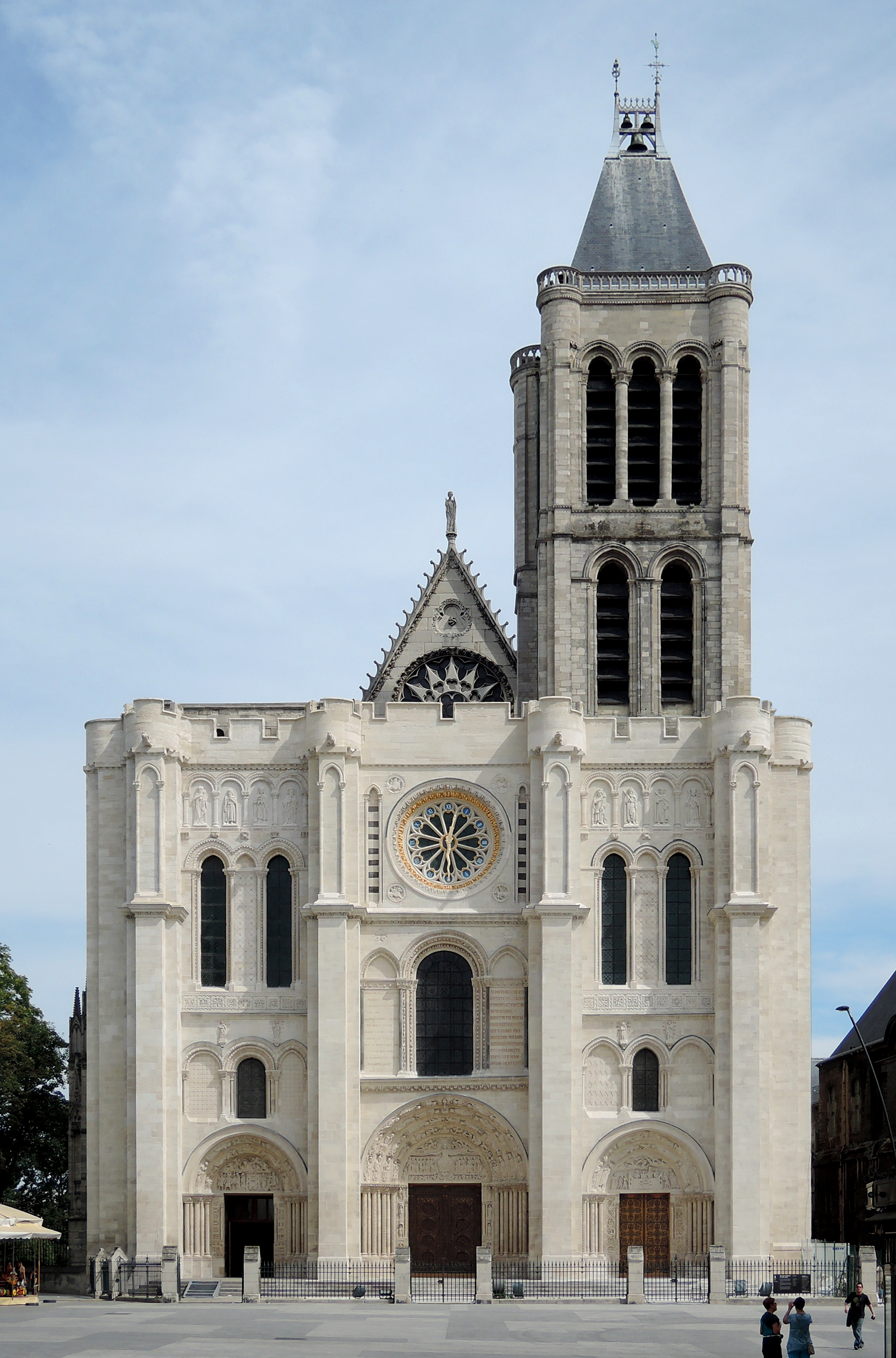
Basilica of Saint Denis, west facade (1130–1140)

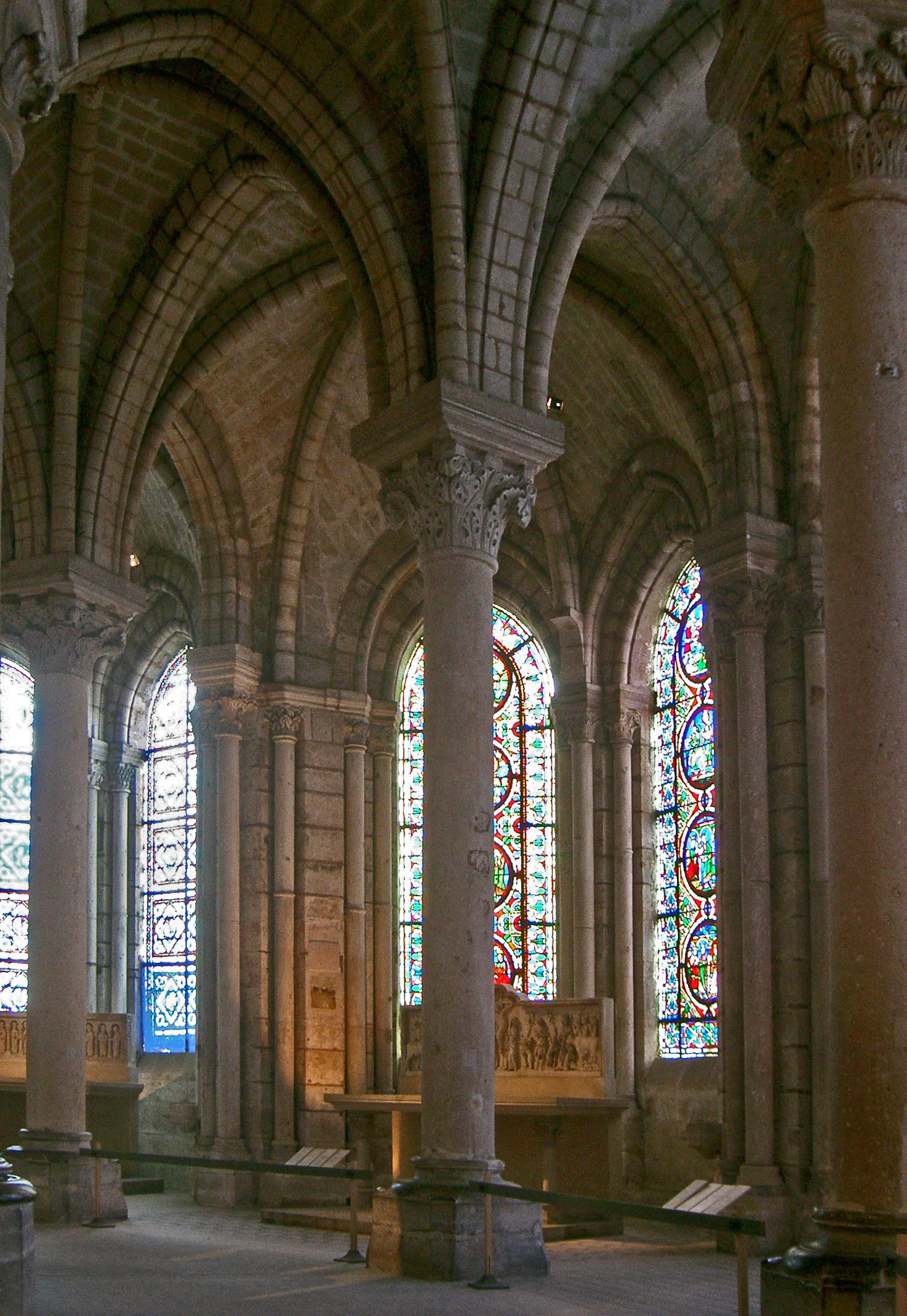
Ambulatory of Basilica of Saint-Denis (c. 1140)

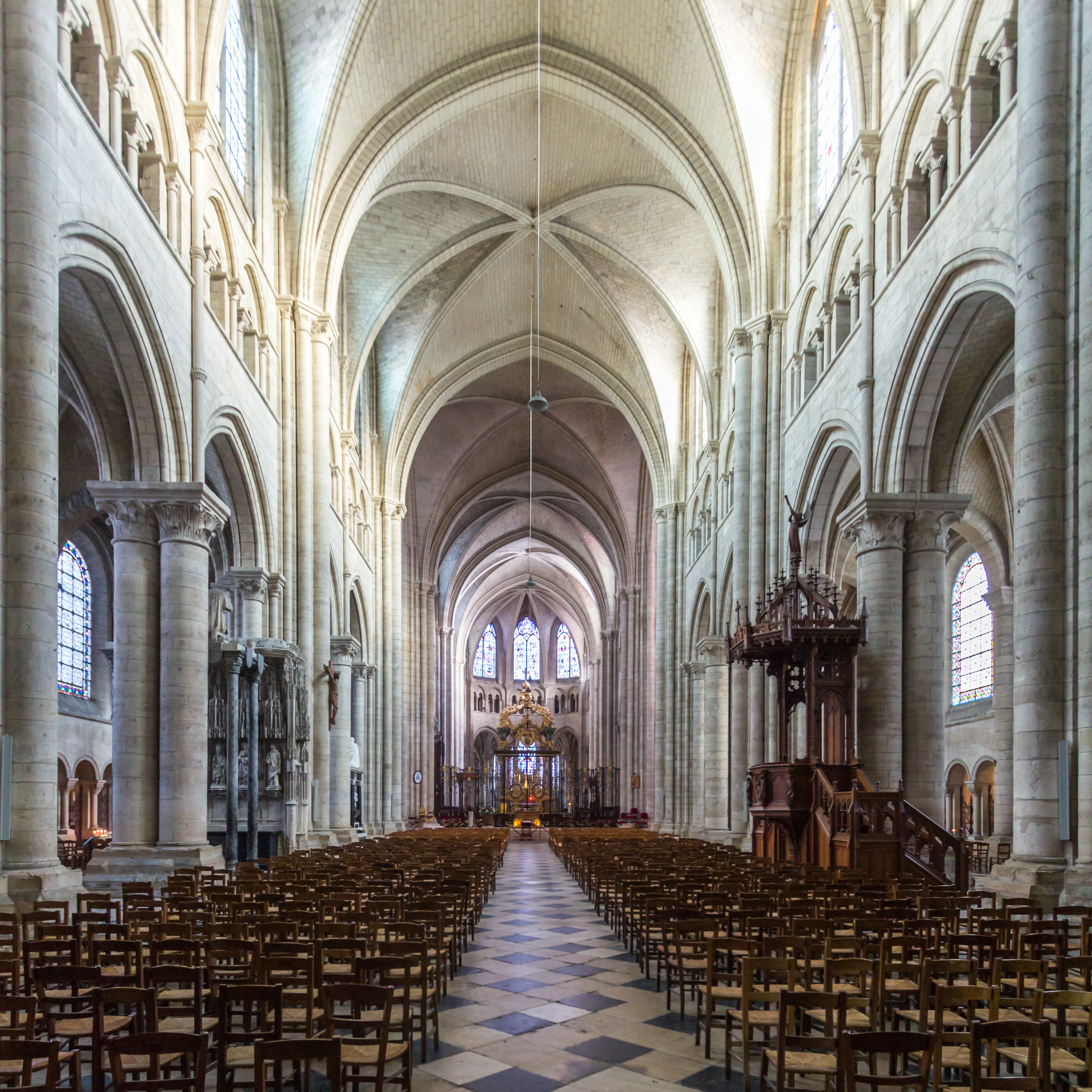
Nave of Sens Cathedral (1140–1164)

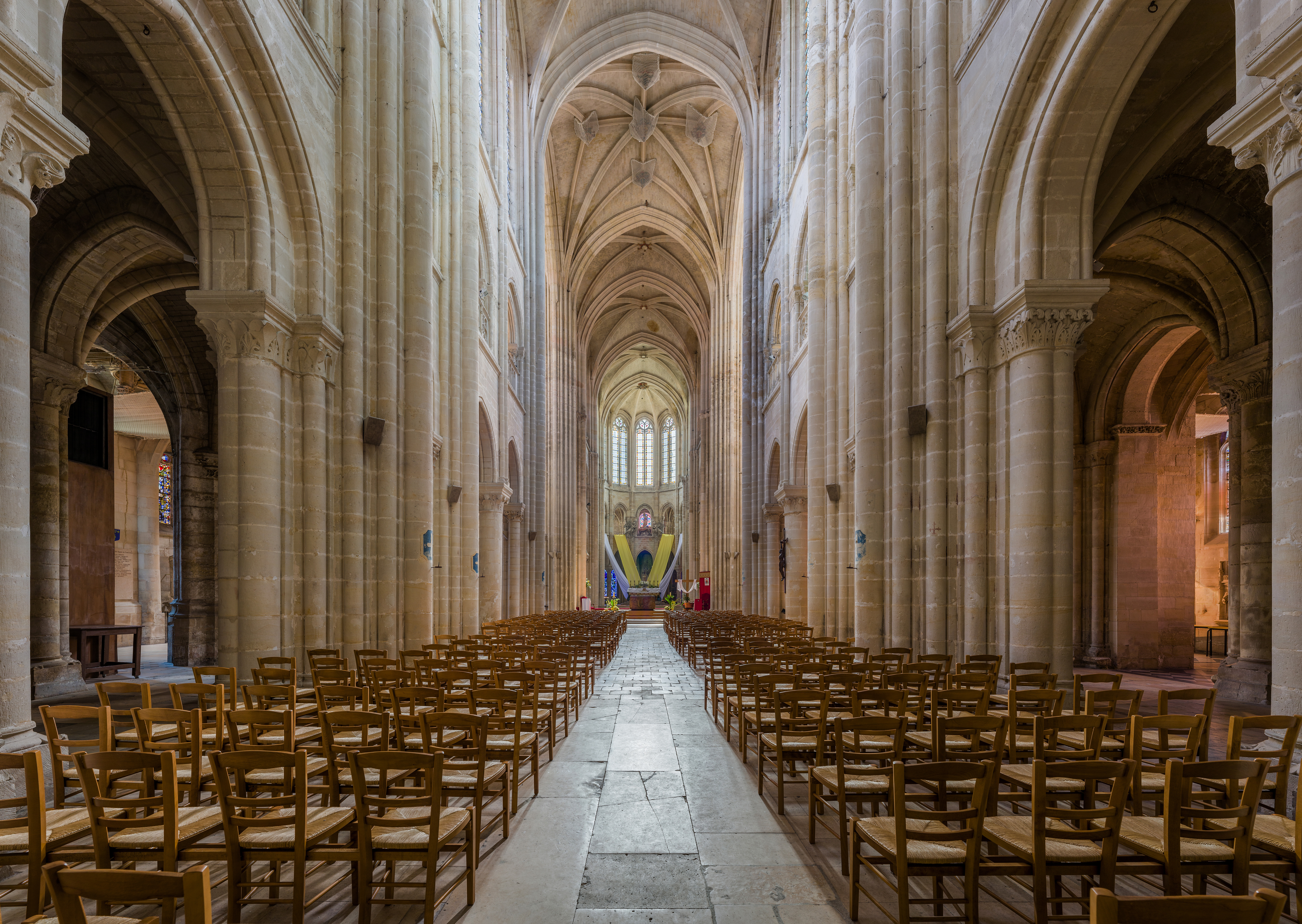
Nave of Senlis Cathedral (1153–1191)

=== Innovations ===
Early Gothic architecture was the solution that the first Gothic builders found to resolve the problem of the earlier Romanesque style; masonry ceilings which were too heavy for the traditional arched barrel vault. The solution to the problem came in the form of the Gothic rib vault, where thin stone ribs spread the weight of the ceiling outward and downwards to flying buttresses.

Another important innovation of the High Gothic was a change in the interior elevations. As thinner walls were made possible by buttresses, intermediate levels, such as the triforium were gradually made smaller. or eliminated. After 1194, the builders of Chartres Cathedral entirely removed the tribune, making more space for stained glass.

Stained glass windows were an important feature of early Gothic architecture, and they were significantly larger than those in earlier periods. Their purpose was to fill the church interior with a mystical coloured light, representing the Holy Spirit, and to illustrate Bible stores for the majority of parishioners who could not read. The windows were necessarily small, because, before the invention of the stone ribs of bar tracery, the windows were held together only with thin strips of iron.

=== Religious and military orders: from the Proto-Gothic to the consolidation of Gothic ===
==== Order of Cluny ====
The monastic reform initiated in 909 at Cluny Abbey preceded the emergence of Gothic architecture by more than two centuries, but it laid the institutional foundations—the relationship between the mother house and its daughter houses, together with the liturgical and architectural standardisation between monasteries belonging to the same congregation—that the Cistercian Order would later inherit and radicalise. It was precisely in opposition to Cluniac architectural magnificence, embodied above all in the great abbey church of Cluny III, that Saint Bernard of Clairvaux would define the principles of austerity that came to characterise Cistercian architecture.

==== Cistercian Order ====
The Cistercian Order was founded in 1098, when a group of monks led by Robert of Molesme left the Benedictine community of Molesme to establish, in an isolated forest within the Diocese of Chalon, the so-called "New Monastery" of Cîteaux. Bernard, born in 1090 into an aristocratic Burgundian family, entered the order only in 1112, during its second generation, and was entrusted the following year with founding its third daughter house, Clairvaux, assuming its leadership only from 1115 onwards—by which time the order had already existed for almost twenty years. It therefore remains debated to what extent the so-called "Bernardine plan" should be attributed to Bernard rather than to the first generation of Cistercians led by Stephen Harding, the third Abbot of Cîteaux. Harding had already defined, through the Carta Caritatis (1113/1114) and the Exordium Parvum, the ideals of poverty and uniformity among the order's houses, though without providing any prescriptions concerning architecture or the visual arts.

It was above all through the Apologia ad Guillelmum Abbatem (1124–1125)—addressed to the Benedictine abbot William of Saint-Thierry and directed, contrary to what older historiography maintained, not only against the Order of Cluny but also against the Cistercian Order itself—that Bernard condemned the use of gold, silver and sculptural or pictorial decoration in monasteries, while not extending this condemnation to urban cathedrals, whose pastoral function among a largely illiterate population justified, in his view, a richer iconographic programme. These ideas were incorporated into the General Chapters of the order before 1134 and reinforced by the Chapter of 1152, which prohibited sculpture, painting and coloured stained glass in Cistercian churches.

From a constructional perspective, the model that spread throughout most Cistercian houses—a Latin-cross plan with projecting transepts and a square-ended chevet without an ambulatory—corresponded to the scheme followed at Clairvaux II (1135–1145), the first Cistercian church with a flat-ended chevet and the one whose influence later gave rise to the designation "Bernardine plan", adopted by scholars such as Karl Heinz Esser and Anselme Dimier. The earliest vaulting employed in Cistercian churches still followed solutions derived from Burgundian Romanesque architecture (pointed barrel vaults), but during the second half of the twelfth century these were progressively replaced by rib vaults, as building campaigns still under way adopted the structural solutions first developed at Saint-Denis. The chevet of Clairvaux itself was rebuilt between 1154 and 1174 with a polygonal ambulatory and radiating chapels (Clairvaux III), a model subsequently adopted by other Cistercian houses, including Pontigny (from 1185) and Longpont and Vaucelles (from 1190).

Despite incorporating Gothic structural solutions—including the rib vault, pointed arch, flying buttress and radiating chevet—the architecture disseminated by the Cistercian Order never corresponded to the cathedral Gothic of northern France, exemplified by Saint-Denis, Notre-Dame de Paris or Notre-Dame de Chartres, since Bernardine principles consistently rejected the decorative splendour characteristic of episcopal and urban Gothic architecture. For this reason, some historians consider it preferable to speak of a "Cistercian aesthetic" or a "Bernardine plan" rather than, strictly speaking, of a unified "Cistercian architecture", since significant regional variations are documented (such as the single nave at Silvanès) and some houses retained the traditional Benedictine plan. Nevertheless, this current of monastic and conventual Gothic—distinct from French episcopal Gothic—would profoundly shape the religious architecture of countries such as Portugal, where cathedral Gothic found comparatively little scope for expansion and where, instead, the austere model promoted by Cîteaux prevailed, the Alcobaça Monastery being its finest example.

==== The mendicant orders ====
Alongside the Cistercian Order, the mendicant orders—the Franciscans, their female branch, the Poor Clares, and the Dominicans—also played a decisive role in the spread of monastic and conventual Gothic, particularly from the second half of the thirteenth century onwards, when increasing numbers of their convents were erected across Europe. Unlike the Cistercians, who favoured isolated valleys away from urban centres, the mendicant orders shifted the focus of religious life into the cities, settling close to the populations to whom they devoted their preaching. Their churches reflect this pastoral mission: they are generally more austere and economically more modest than the great Cistercian or Benedictine abbeys, usually consisting of a single nave roofed with timber, with vaulting reserved only for the chancel and apse chapels, thereby dispensing with the flying buttress system characteristic of the great cathedrals.

==== The military orders ====
The military orders—born from the fusion of the monastic ideal with the military vocation in the context of the Crusades and the Reconquista—constitute a third architectural current within Gothic, distinct from both the urban cathedral model and the Cistercian and mendicant traditions. The Knights Templar and the Knights Hospitaller, founded in the aftermath of the First Crusade, developed distinctive architectural typologies, notably centrally planned or polygonal churches inspired by eastern models and associated with the memory of the Church of the Holy Sepulchre. In the Iberian context, this tradition continued through the military orders established during the Reconquista—the Order of Aviz, the Order of Santiago and, above all, the Order of Christ, which inherited the Templars' possessions in Portugal. The Convent of Christ at Tomar, with its centrally planned charola, is the foremost example of this architectural tradition in Portuguese territory.

== Classification of periods ==
In the classification of architecture periods, Early Gothic raises certain issues. Early Gothic is defined as a style that used some principle elements of Gothic, but not all. Especially, it had no fine tracery. It marks the first phase of a division of Gothic style into three periods. If it is used for all countries, it has to be regarded that there may be special terms for the styles of single countries, such as Early English in England.

In France, where Gothic style began, another phasing has been established:

- Gothique primitif (Primary Gothic) or Gothique premier (First Gothic), from short before 1140 until short after 1180, marked by tribunes above the aisles of basilicas.
- Gothique classique (Classic Gothic), from the 1180s to the first third of 13th century, marked by basilicas without lateral tribunes and with triforia without windows. Some buildings of this phase, like Chartres Cathedral, have to be subsumed to Early Gothic, others, like the Reims Cathedral and the western parts of Amiens Cathedral, have to be subsumed to High Gothic.
- Gothique rayonnant (Radiant or Shining Gothic), from the second third of 13th century to the first half of 14th century, marked by triforia with windows and a general preference for stained glass instead of stone walls. It forms the greater portion of High Gothic.
- Gothique flamboyant (Flaming Gothic), since mid 14th century, marked by swinging and flaming (that makes the term) forms of tracery.

The term "Early Gothic" should not be extended backward; if Durham Cathedral and other buildings with the first rib vaults in Romanesque walls are subsumed to this style, most of German Late Romanesque architecture would be Early Gothic.

Primary Gothic appeared in northern France in the 1130s. In Normandy, it was mixed with regional traditions. In England, it gave the example for Early English architecture. It combined and developed several key elements from earlier styles, particularly from Romanesque architecture, including the rib vault, flying buttress, and the pointed arch, and used them in innovative ways to create structures, particularly Gothic cathedrals and churches, of exceptional height and grandeur, filled with light from stained glass windows. Notable examples of early Gothic architecture in France include the ambulatory and facade of Saint-Denis Basilica; Sens Cathedral (1140); Laon Cathedral; Senlis Cathedral; (1160) and most famously Notre-Dame de Paris (begun 1160).

Early English Gothic was influenced by the French style, particularly in the new choir of Canterbury Cathedral, but soon developed its own particular characteristics, particularly an emphasis for length over height, and more complex and asymmetric floor plans, square rather than rounded east ends, and polychrome decoration, using Purbeck marble. Major examples are the nave and west front of Wells Cathedral, the choir of Lincoln Cathedral, and the early portions of Salisbury Cathedral.

Early Gothic was succeeded in the early 13th century by a new wave of larger and taller buildings, with further technical innovations, in a style later known as High Gothic.

== Early French Gothic cathedrals ==
=== Basilica of Saint-Denis ===
The Basilica of Saint-Denis was important because it was the burial place of the French Kings of the Capetian dynasty from the late 10th until the early 14th century. It attracted a very large number of pilgrims, attracted by the relics of Saint Denis, the patron saint of Paris. To accommodate the large number of pilgrims, Suger first constructed a new narthex and façade at the west end, with twin towers and a rose window in the centre.

The most original and influential step made by Suger was the creation of the chevet, or east end, with radiating chapels. Here he used the pointed arch and rib vault in a new way, replacing the thick dividing walls with arched rib vaults poised on columns with sculpted capitals. Suger wrote that the new chevet was "ennobled by the beauty of length and width." And "the midst of the edifice was suddenly raised aloft by twelve columns". He added that, when creating this feature, he was inspired by the ancient Roman columns he had seen in the ruins of the Baths of Diocletian and elsewhere in Rome. He described the finished work as "a circular string of chapels, by virtue of which the whole church would shine with the wonderful and uninterrupted light of most luminous windows, pervading the interior beauty."

Suger was an admirer of the doctrines of the early Christian philosopher John Scotus Eriugena (c. 810–87) and Dionysus, or the Pseudo-Areopagite, who taught that light was a divine manifestation, and that all things were "material lights", reflecting the infinite light of God himself. Therefore, stained glass became a way to create a glowing, unworldly light ideal for religious reflection.

According to Suger, every aspect of the new apse architecture had a symbolic meaning. The twelve columns separating the chapels, he wrote, represented the twelve Apostles, while the twelve columns of the side aisles represented the minor prophets of the Old Testament.

The Basilica, including the upper parts of the choir and the apse, were extensively modified into the Rayonnant style in the 1230s, but the original early Gothic ambulatory and chapels can still be seen.

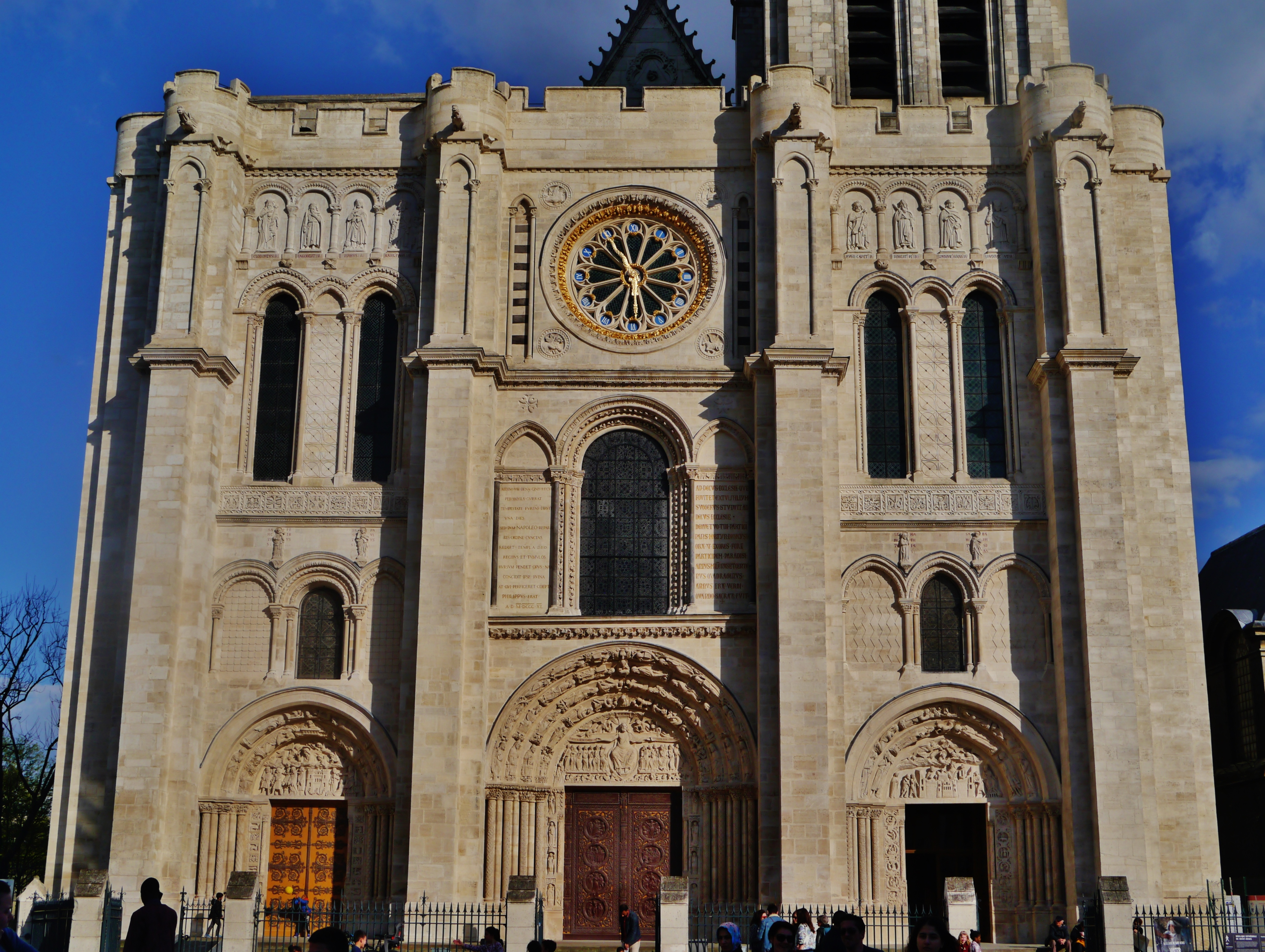
Detail of the west front (12th c.) restored 1839

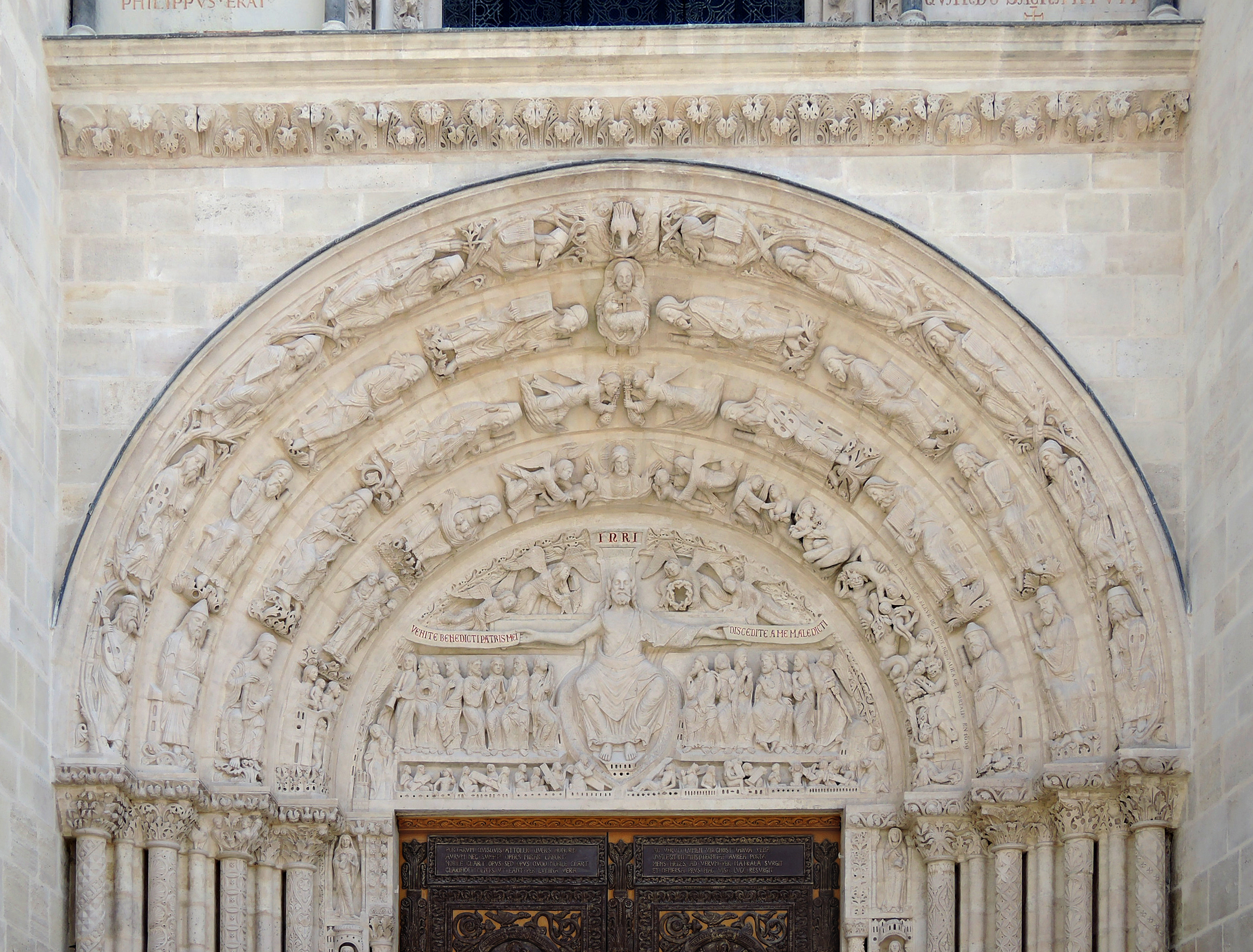
Tympanum and lintel of the central portal "Last Judgement (c. 1135, restored 1839)

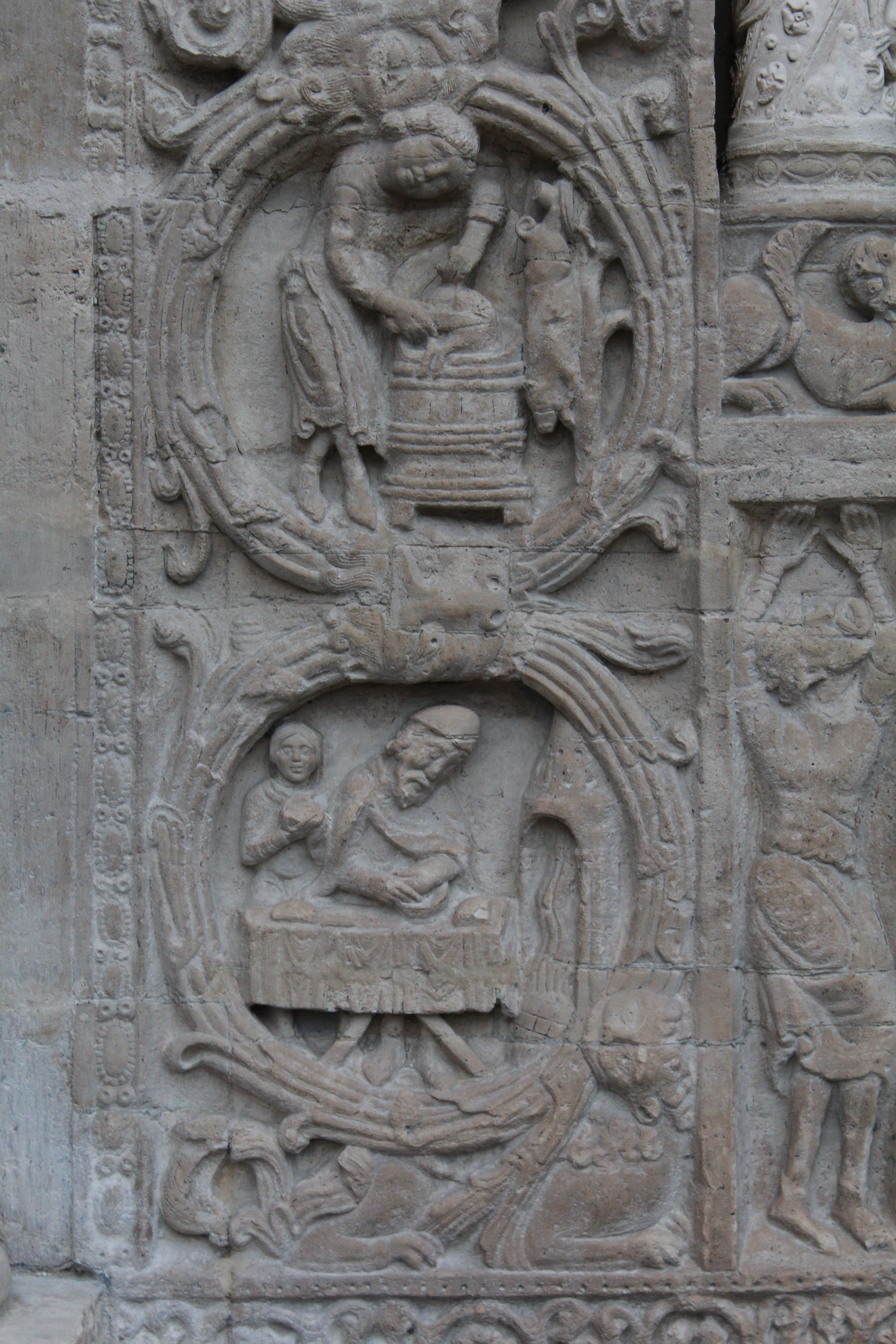
Early decoration of West Front

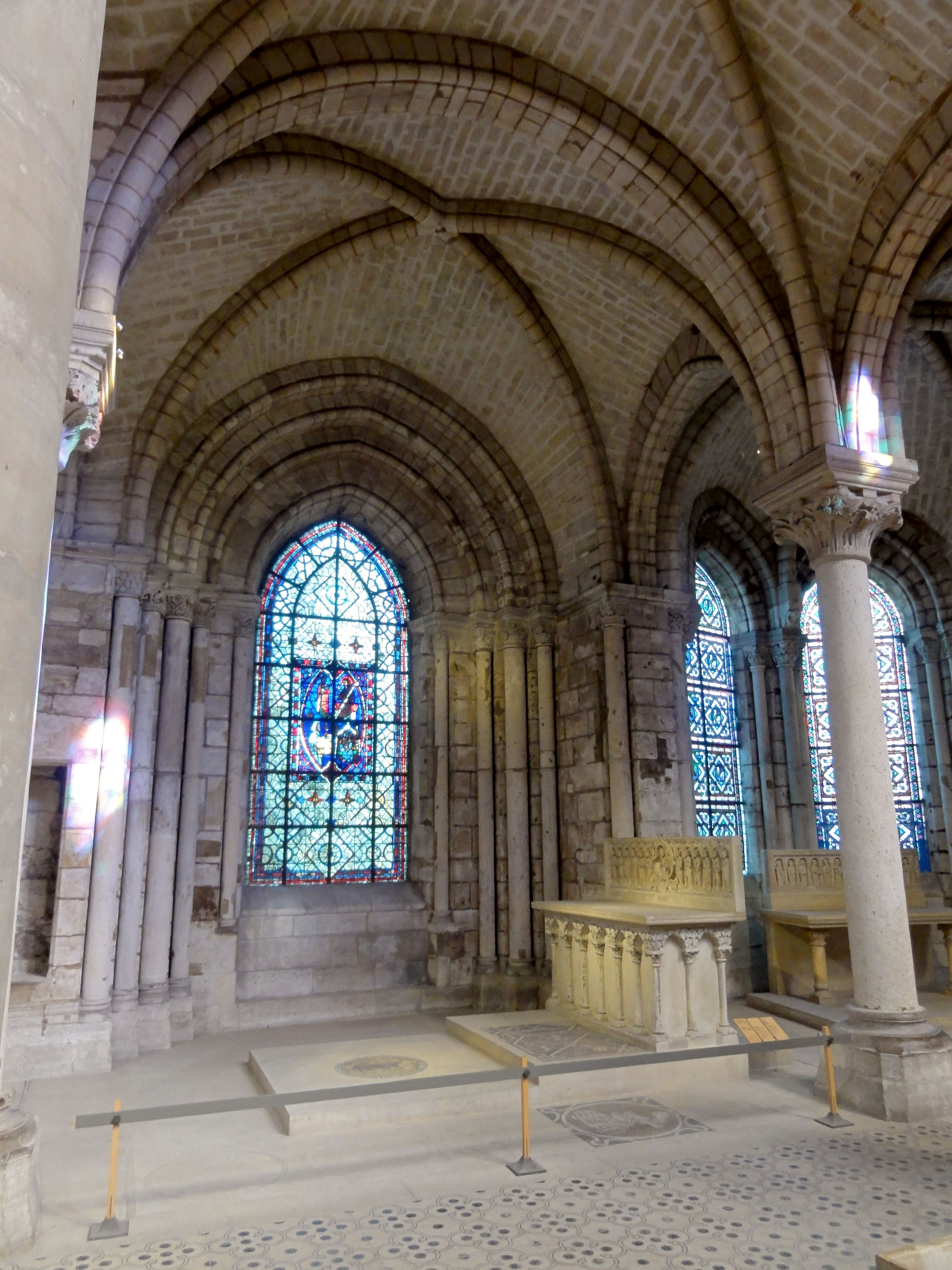
Saint Fermin chapel (12th c.)

=== Sens Cathedral ===
The construction of the choir and ambulatory of Sens Cathedral began before the construction of the ambulatory of Saint-Denis. Therefore, the ambulatory is rather Romanesque than Gothic. All adjacent chapels are much later and no more Primary Gothic. But its arcades and triforia already fit the criteria of Gothic architecture. It was constructed between 1135 and 1164. Different from the other cathedrals of Primary Gothic, it has no tribunes above the aisles, but triforia as one of three levels, alike some Romanesque basilicas before and Classic Gothic afterwards. It used the new six-part rib vault in the nave, giving the church exceptional width and height. Because the six-part vaults distributed the weight unevenly, the vaults were supported by alternating massive square piers and more slender round columns. It had a wide impact on the Gothic style not only in France, but also in England, because its master builder, William of Sens, was invited to England and introduced Early Gothic features to the reconstructed choir of Canterbury Cathedral.

In the following centuries, all clerestories were remodelled, and the transept is Flamboyant.

<

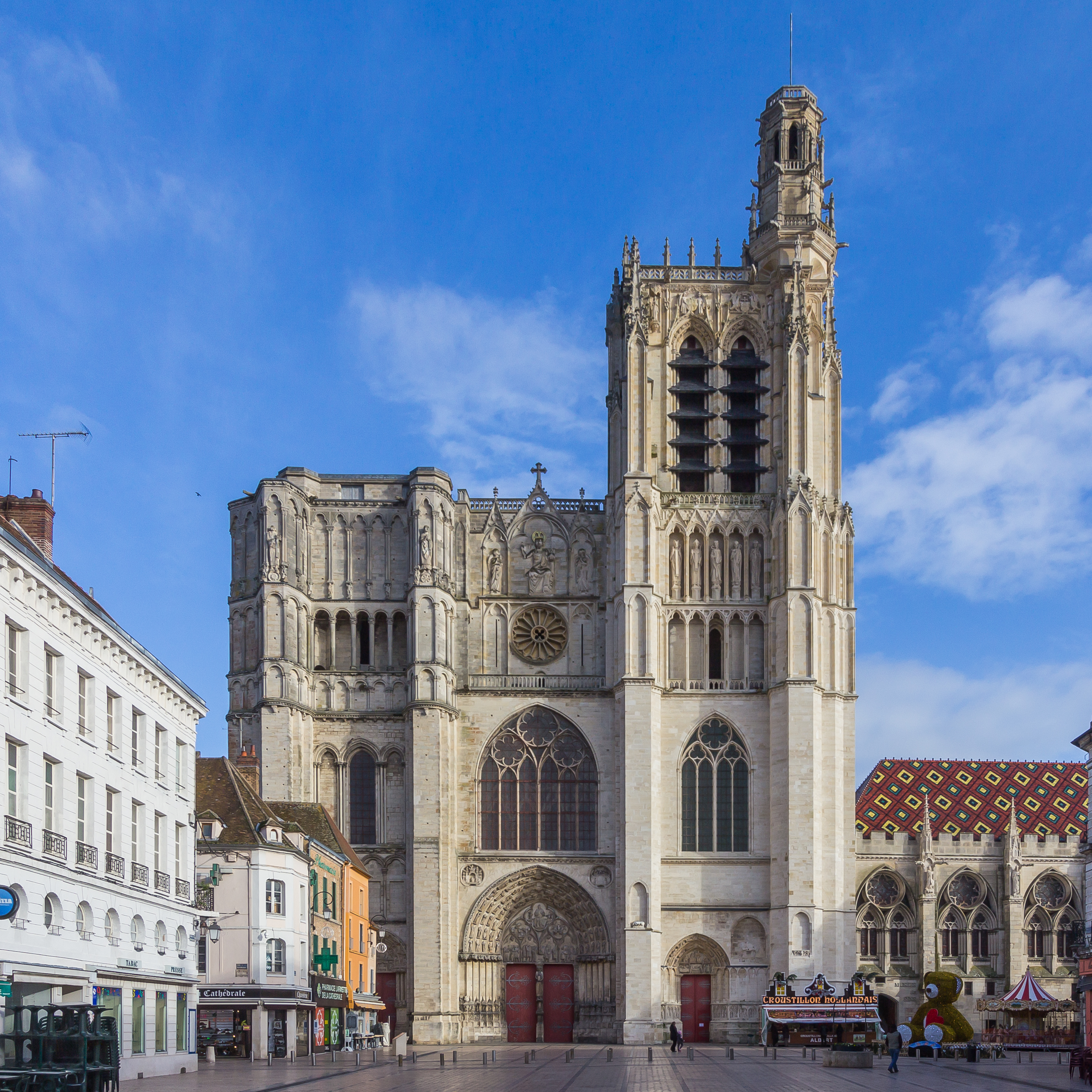
Facade of Sens Cathedral (1135–64)

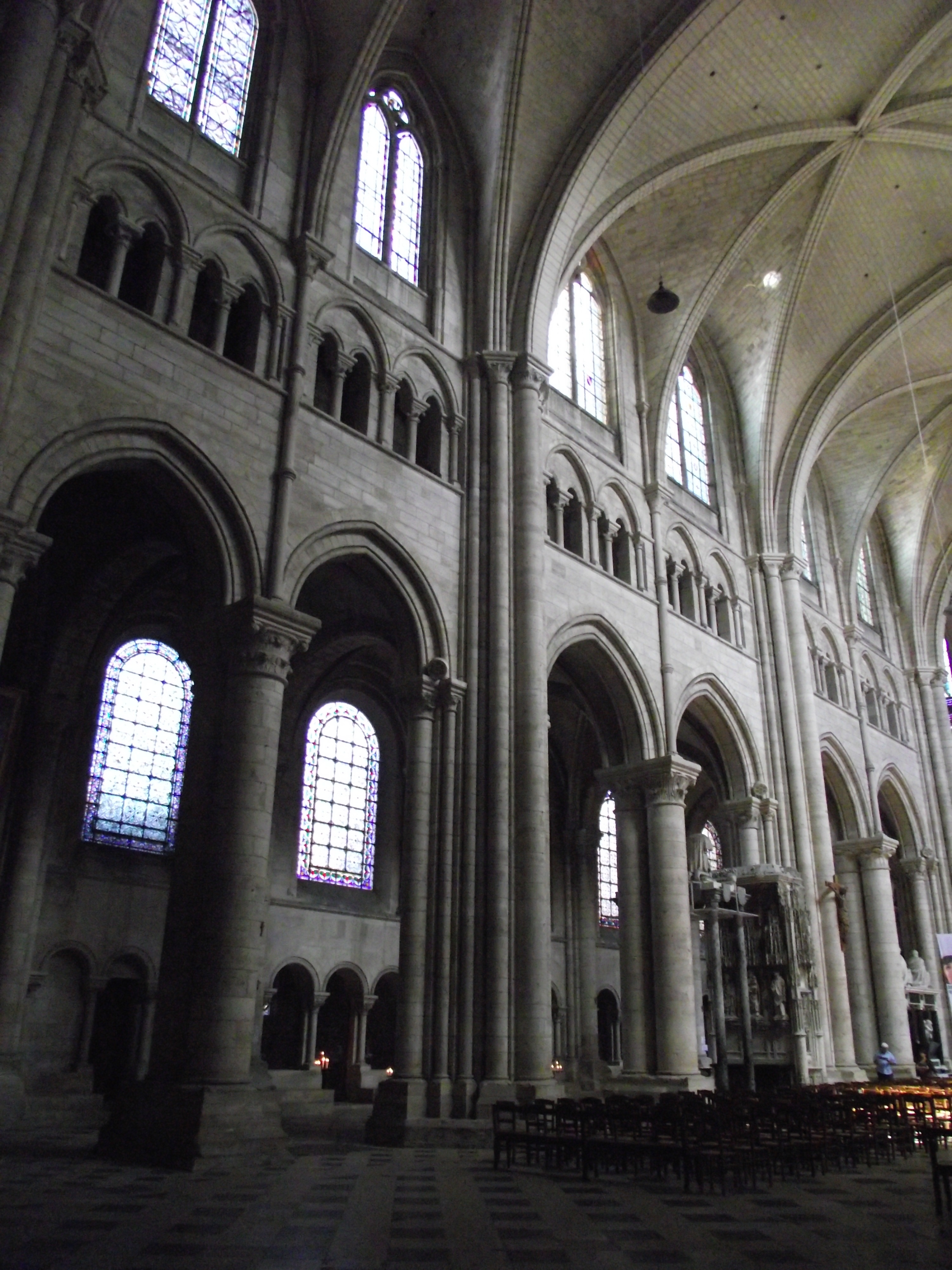
Elevation of Sens Cathedral: three levels; the tribune above the aisle, typical for Early Gothic or Primary Gothic, is still missing.

=== Senlis Cathedral ===
Senlis Cathedral was built between 1153 and 1191. Its length was limited by modest budget and by the placement of the building against the city wall. Like Sens cathedral, it was composed of a nave without a transept, flanked by a single collateral. The radiating chapels of the choir are separate extensions of the ambulatory (different from Saint-Denis, where they form something like an outer aisle). They gave an example for Magdeburg Cathedral that was begun in 1209 and has a polygonal ambulatory and chapels. The elevation of Senlis originally had four levels, including large tribunes. Like Sens, Senlis Cathedral had alternating strong and weak piers to receive the uneven thrust from the six-part rib vaults. The church underwent considerable rebuilding in the 13th and 16th century, including a new tower and new interior decorations. Many of the early Gothic features are overladen with Flamboyant and later decoration. In the 16th century, the triforia disappeared, whereas the tribunes kept their Primary Gothic layout until today.

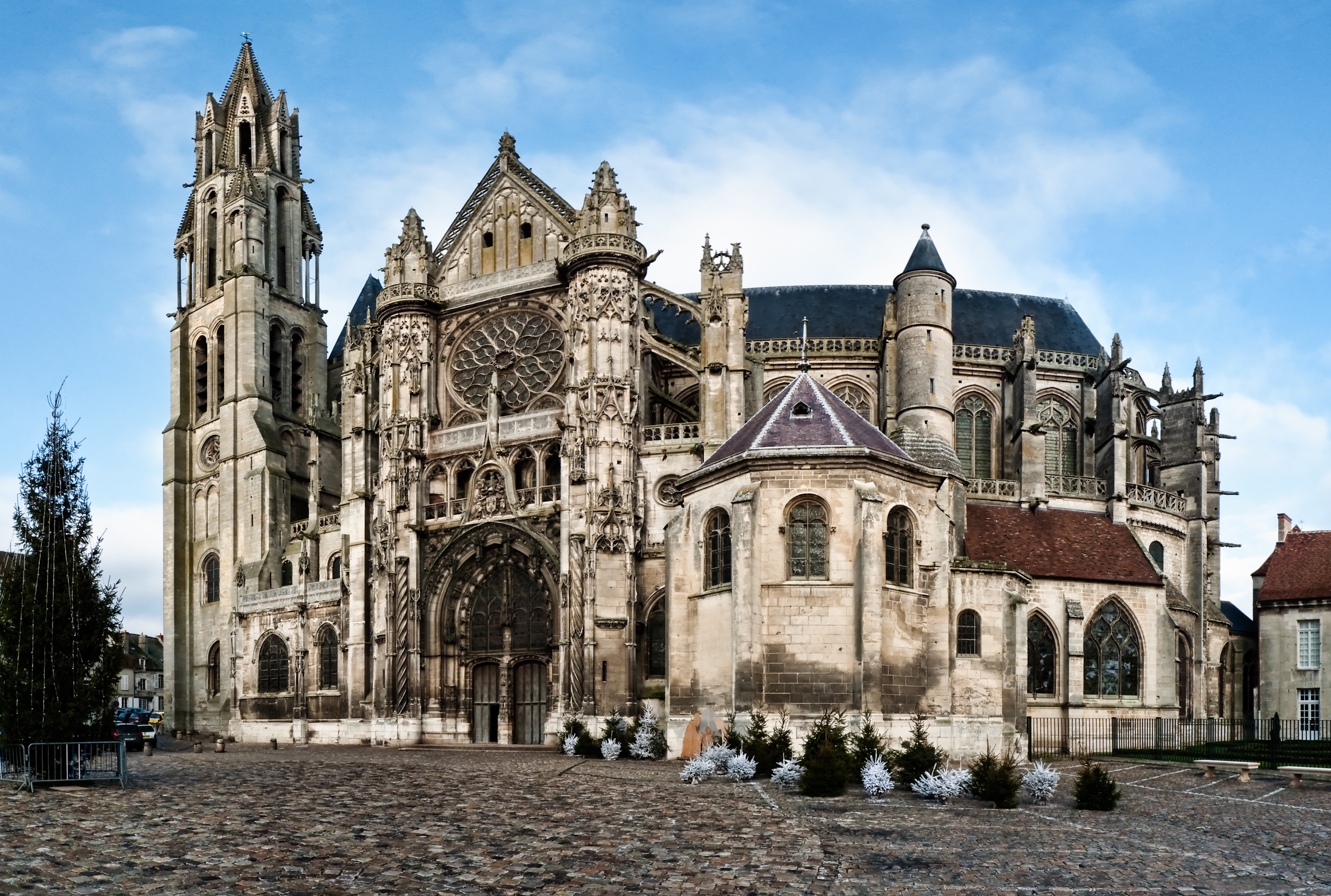
Senlis Cathedral

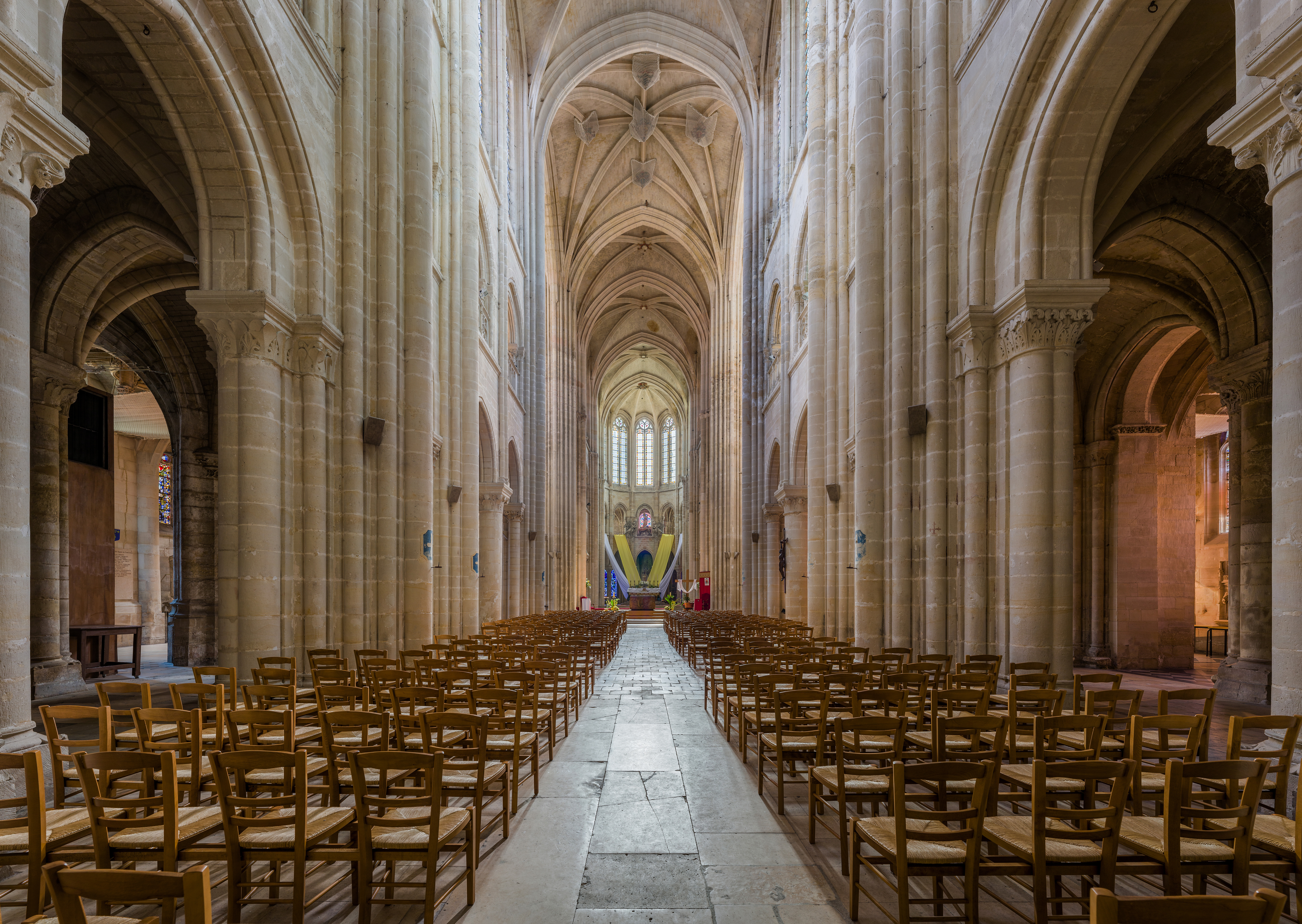
Nave: arcades and tribunes 1153–91

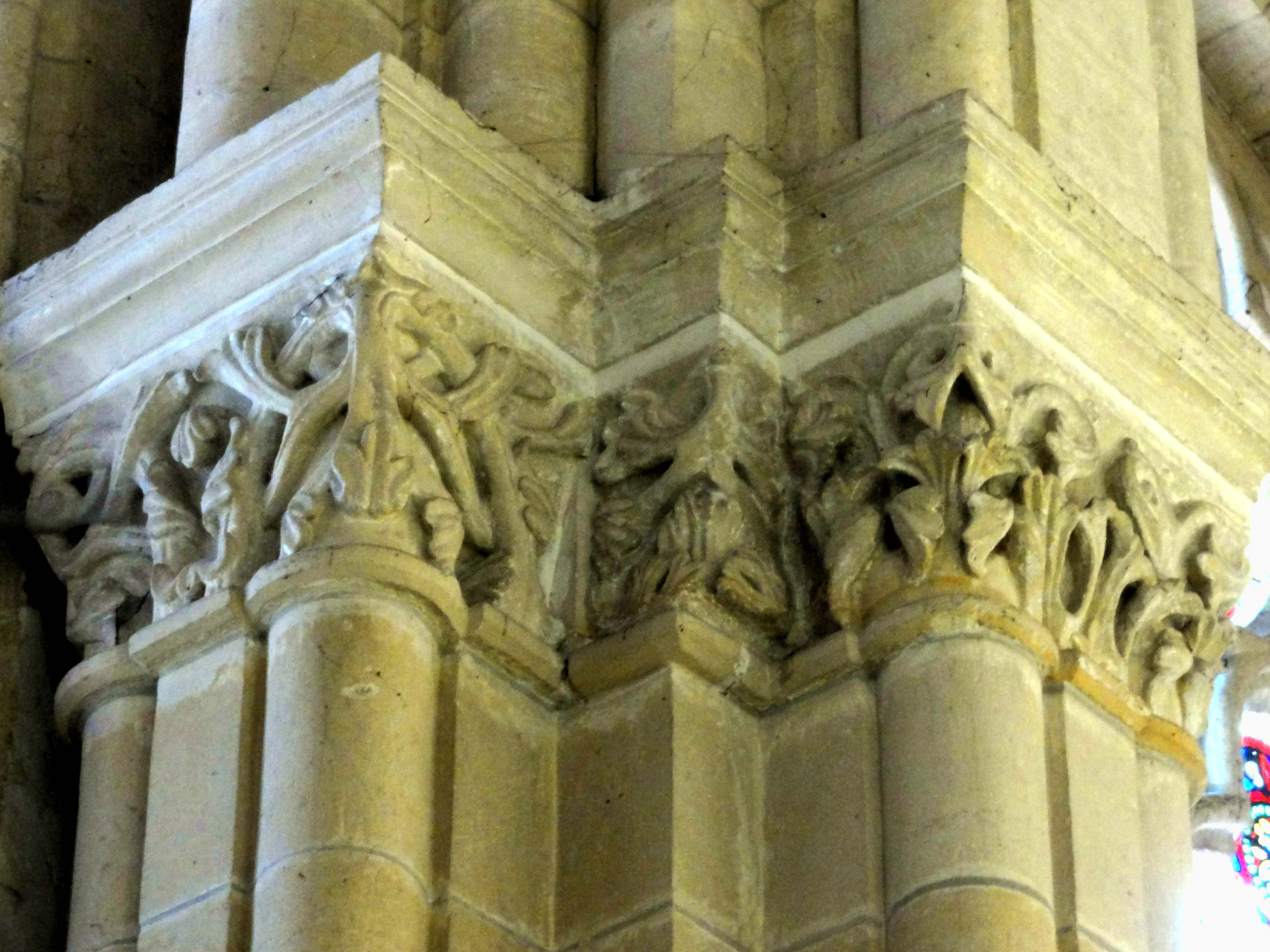
Sculpted capitals of the piers, Chapel of Sainte-Genevieve

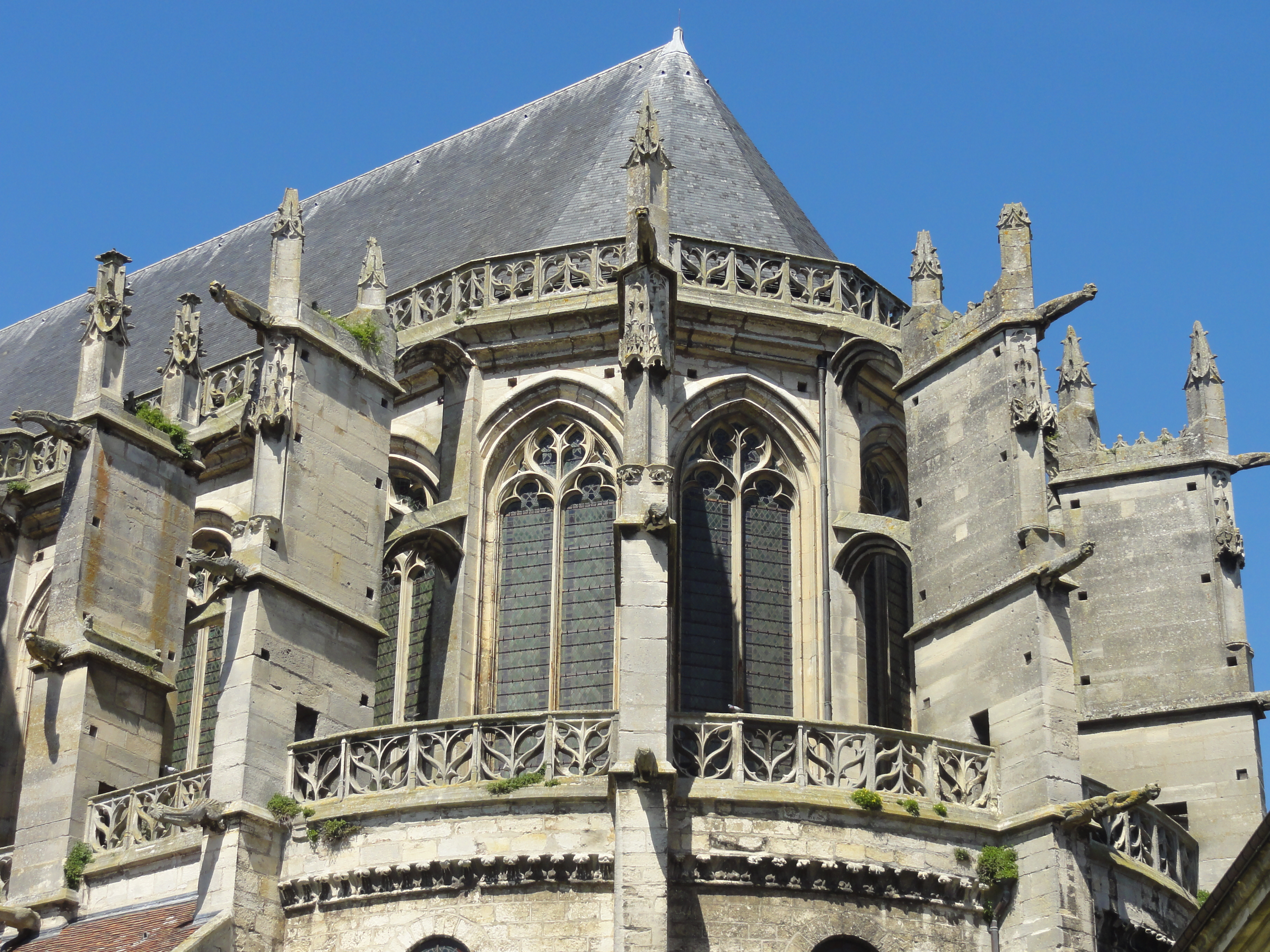
Buttresses of Primary Gothic, Flamboyant clerestory of C XVI

=== Noyon Cathedral ===
Noyon Cathedral, begun between 1145 and 1155, was the first of a series of famous cathedrals to appear in Picardy, the prosperous region north of Paris. The city has an important connection with French history, as the coronation site of Charlemagne and of the early French king Hugh Capet. The new cathedral still had many Romanesque features, including prominent transepts with rounded ends and deep galleries, but it introduced several Gothic innovations, including the fourth level, the triforium a narrow passageway between the ground-level gallery, the tribunes, and the top level clerestory, Noyon also used massive compound piers alternating with round columns, necessary because of the uneven weight distribution from the six-part vaults. The east end has five radiating chapels and three levels of windows, creating a created a dramatic flood of light into the nave.

Noyon Cathedral

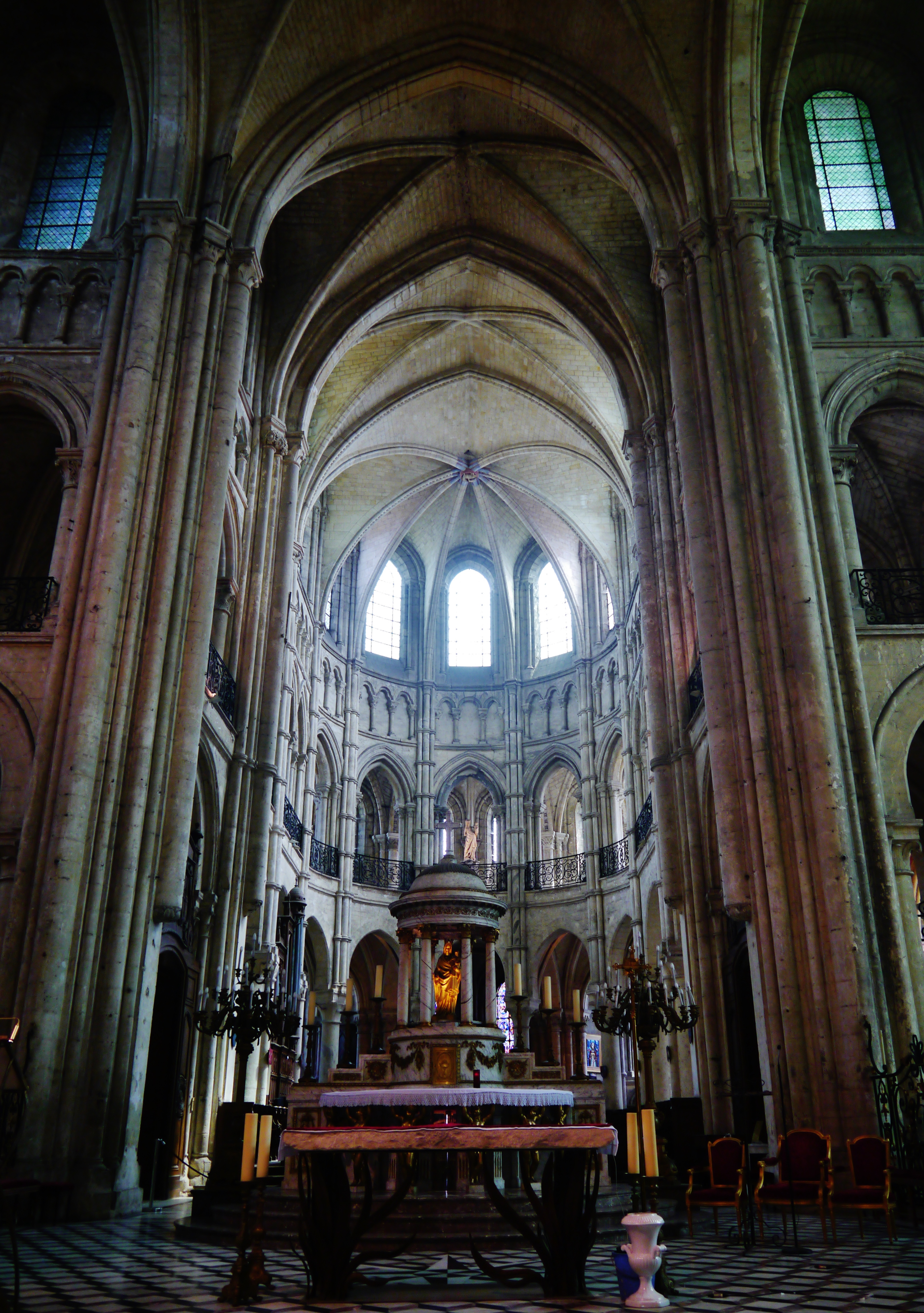
Choir, begun short after 1150, elevation with 4 levels: arcade, tribune, triforium, clerestory

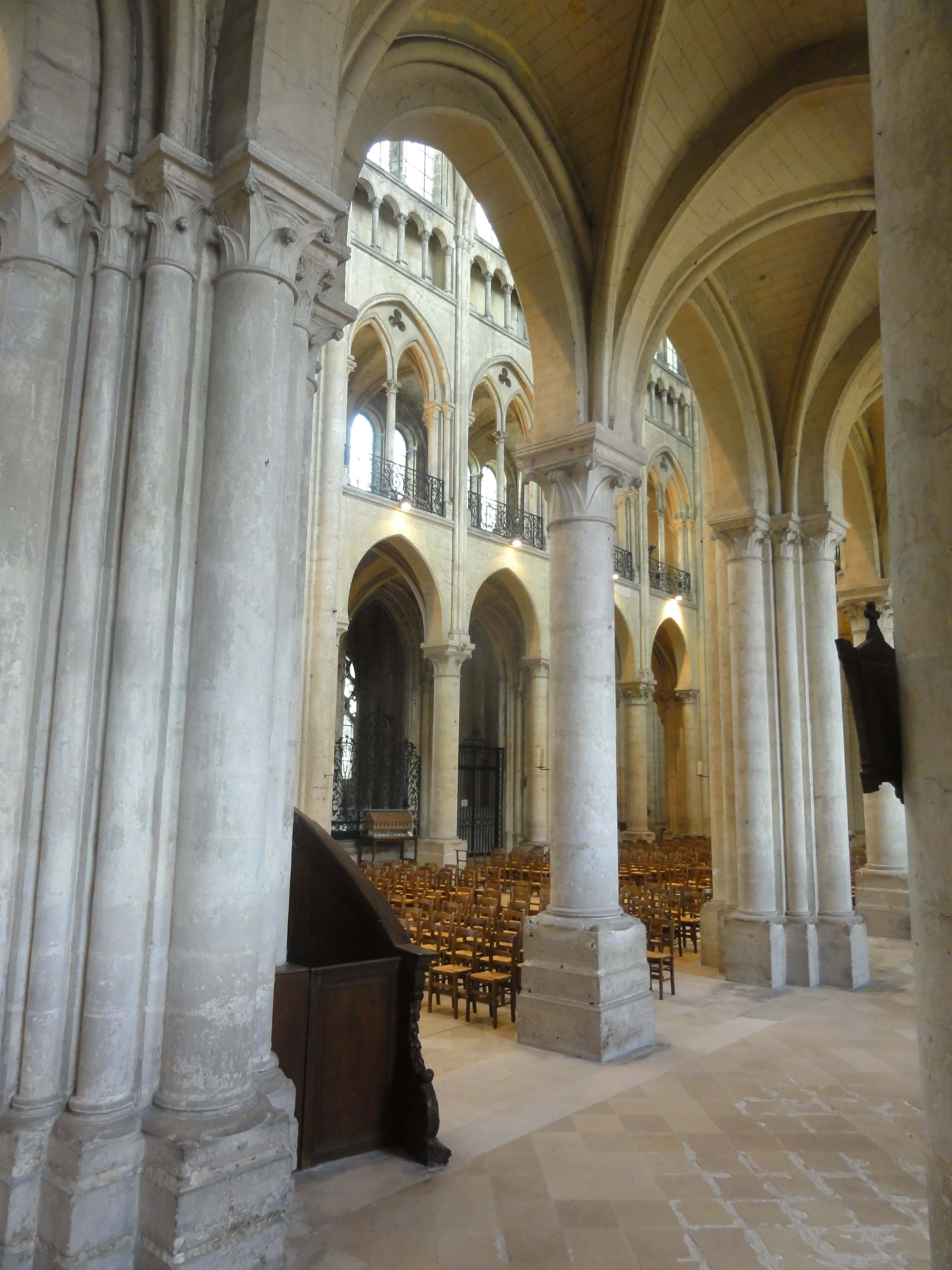
The alternating piers and columns of the grand arcade, which support the vaults

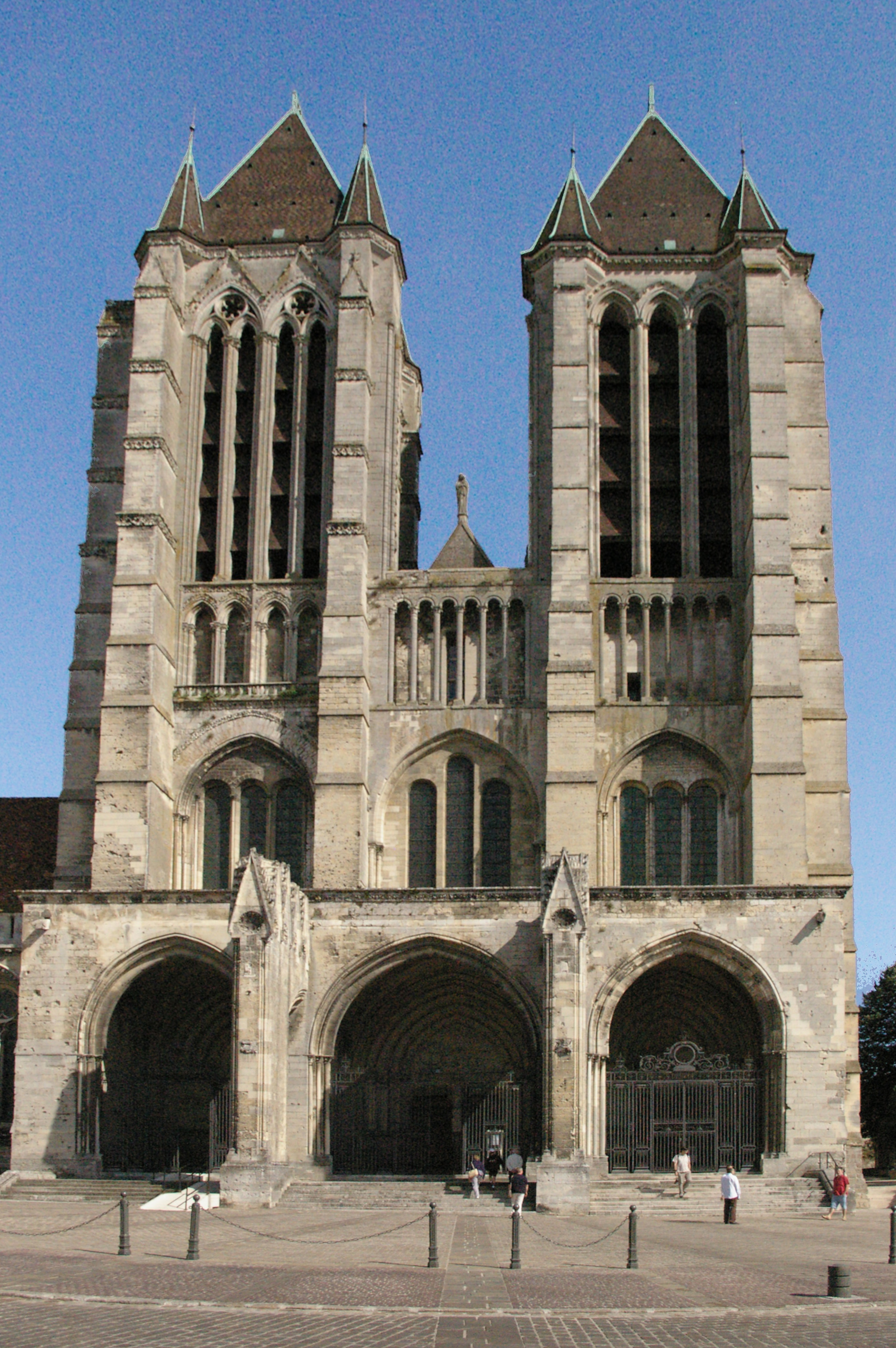
Façade, 1200–1235, Classic Gothic

=== Laon Cathedral ===
Laon Cathedral was begun in 1155, in the Early Gothic or Primary Gothic style. In about 1180, the (first) choir, crossing and transept and the eastern five bays of the nave were finished. The western part of the nave and the façade followed until 1200. Therefore, the façade is already an example of Classic Gothic; Villard de Honnecourt praised the innovative upper parts of the towers. But the original choir began to decay and in 1205–1220 was replaced by the actual one. Following English examples, it has no apse, but a rectangular east end.

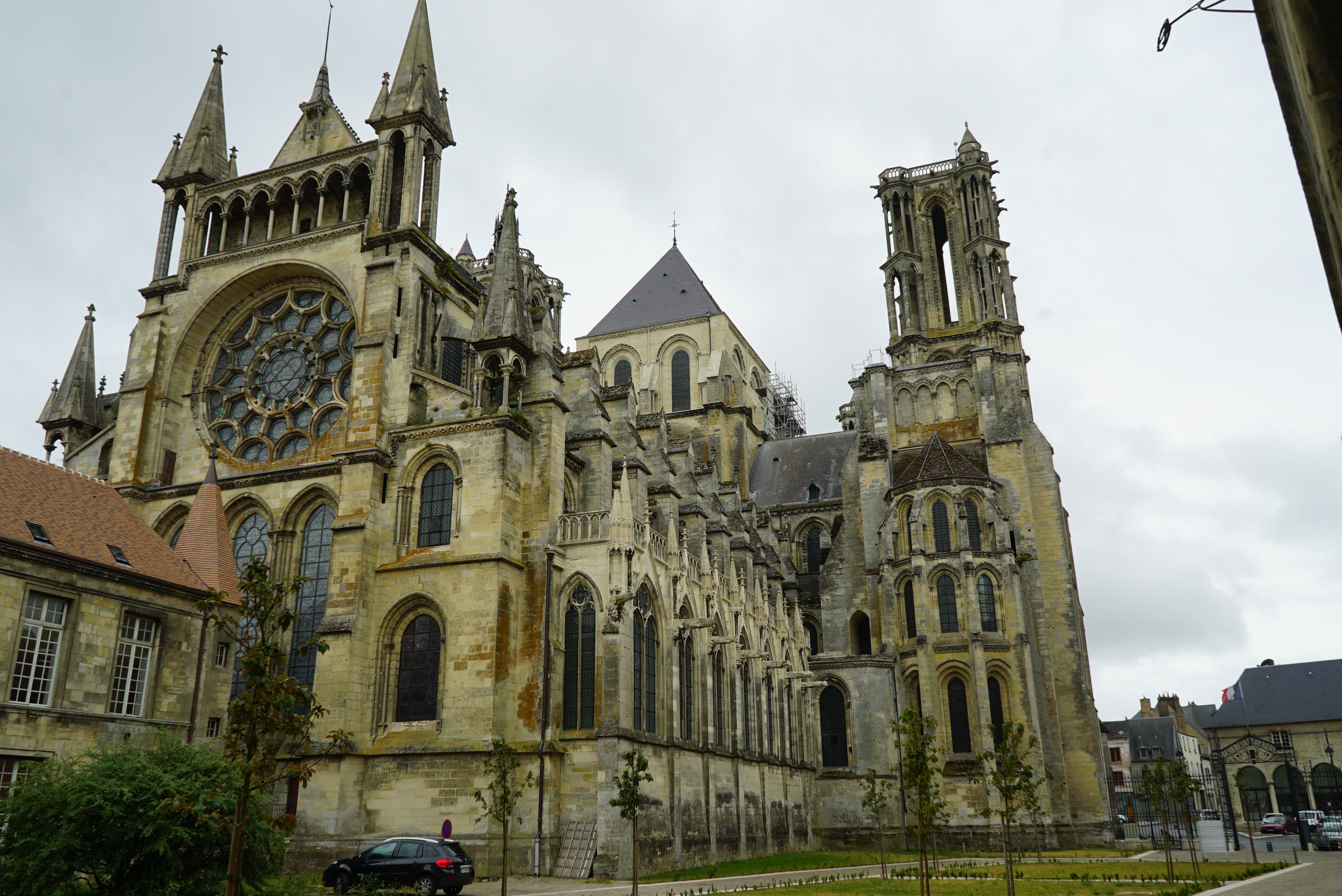
Choir of Laon Cathedral, replaced in 1205–1220, Classic Gothic & "English"

Laon was built upon a hilltop one hundred metres high, making it visible from a great distance. The hilltop imposed a special burden for the builders; all the stones had to be carried to the top of the hill in carts drawn by oxen. The oxen who did the work were honoured by statues on the tower of the finished cathedral.

Laon was also unusual because of its five towers; two on the west front, two on the transepts, and an octagonal lantern on crossing. Laon, like most early Gothic cathedrals, had four interior levels. Laon also had alternating octagonal and square piers supporting the nave, but these rested upon massive pillars made of dreamlike sections of stone, giving it greater harmony and a greater sensation of length. The new cathedral was unusual in form; the apse on the east was flat, not rounded, and the choir was exceptionally long, nearly as long as the nave. Another striking feature of Laon Cathedral were the three great rose windows, one on the west facade and two on the transepts. (Only the west and north windows still remain). Another unusual feature at Laon is the lantern tower at the transept crossing, most likely inspired by the Norman Gothic abbey churches in Caen.

Laon Cathedral was the model for the first Gothic project in Germany, the rebuilding of Limburg Cathedral, begun in the 1180s.

Laon Cathedral

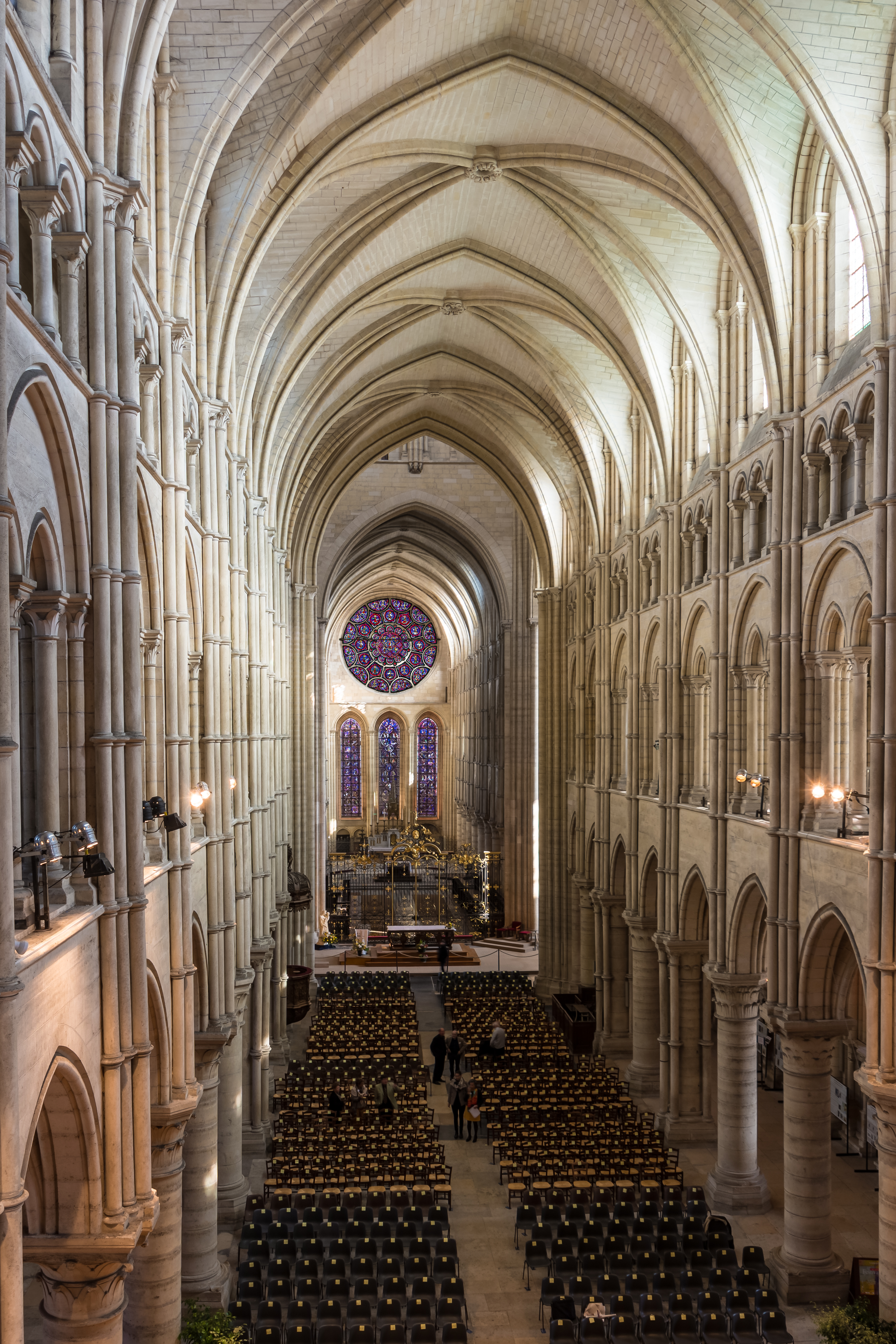
Eastern part of the nave (before 1180), towards the choir, replaced in 1205–1220.

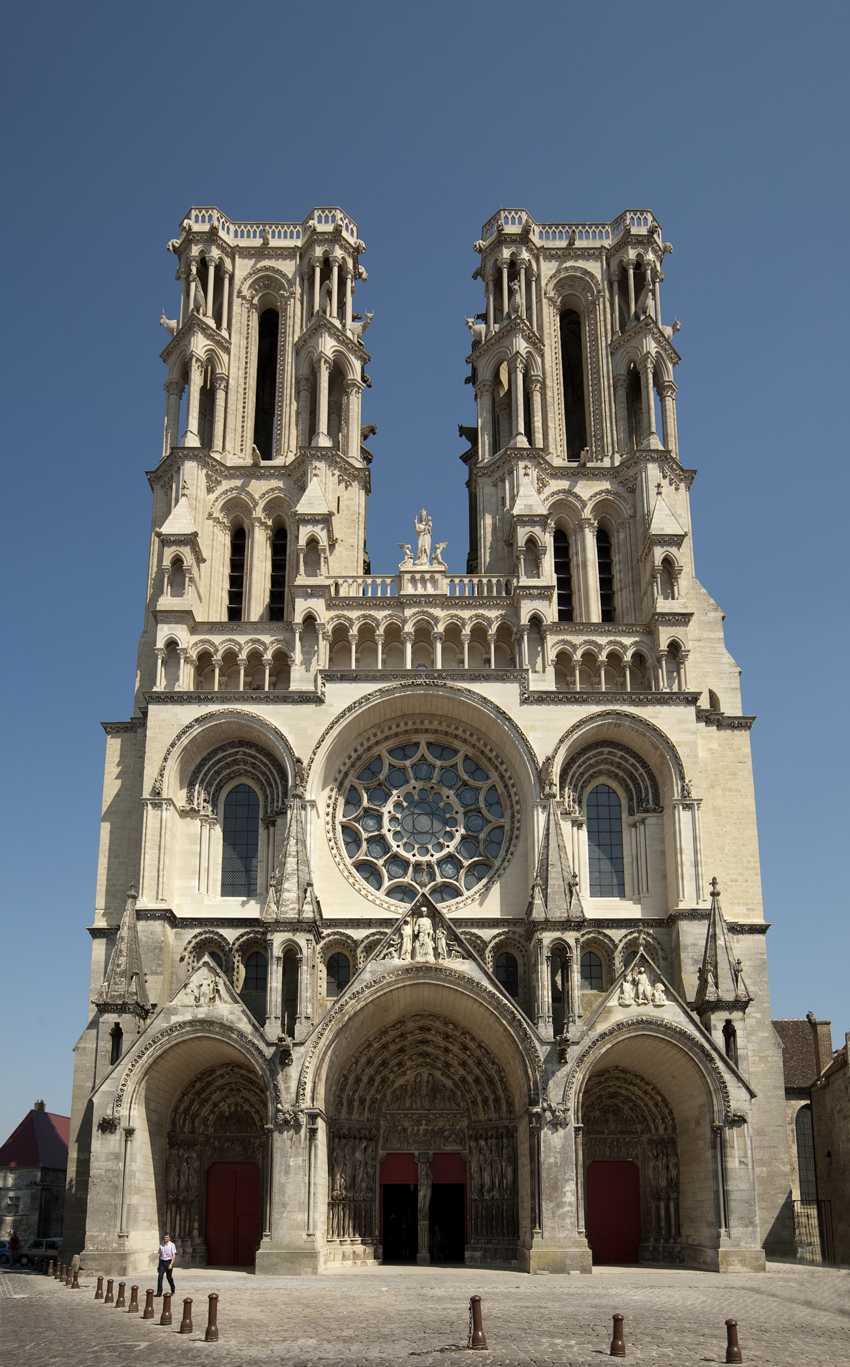
Façade (1180–1200)

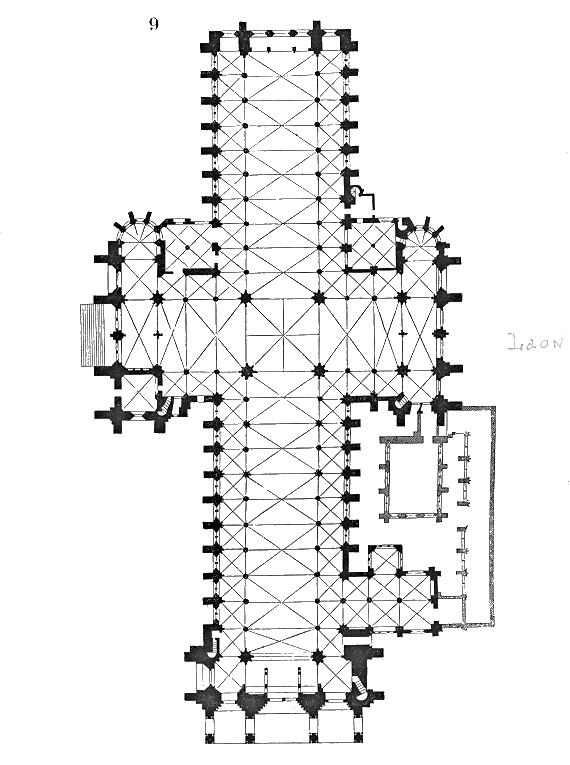
"English" footplan

=== Notre Dame de Paris ===
Notre Dame de Paris was the largest of the Early Gothic cathedrals, and marked the summit of the Early Gothic in France. It was begun in 1163 by the Bishop Maurice de Sully with the intention of surpassing all other existing churches in Europe. The new cathedral was 122 meters long and 35 meters high, eleven meters higher than Laon Cathedral, the previous tallest church. It featured a central nave flanked by double collaterals, and a choir surrounded by a double ambulatory, without radiating chapels. (The current chapels were added between the buttresses in the 14th century).

The builders covered the interior of the cathedral with six-part vaults, but unlike Sens and other the earlier cathedrals they did not use alternating piers and columns to support them. The vaults were supported instead by bundles of three uninterrupted slender columns which were received by rows massive pillars with capitals decorated with classical decoration. This gave the nave greater harmony.

The upper parts of the choir were built at about 1182 or 1185, not long before Chartres Cathedral. Its original elevations were intermediate between tree levels and four levels: above the tribunes there were no veritable triforia, but a clerestory with two levels of windows, the lower level consisted of small rose windows, and the upper level of modest pointed arched windows without tracery.

In the 13th century, when it was decided that the interior was too dark, and the upright windows were enlarged downward into the area of the small roses. Around the transept, the original design was reconstructed during the restoration by Viollet-le-Duc.

The flying buttress made its first appearance in Paris in the early 13th century, either at Notre Dame, or perhaps earlier in the Abbey of Saint-Germain-des-Pres. The buttresses reached from heavy towers outside the nave, over the top of the tribunes, and pressed directly against the upper walls of the nave, countering the outward thrust from the ceiling vaults. This made possible thinner walls and the installation of larger windows in the upper walls of the nave

Notre Dame de Paris

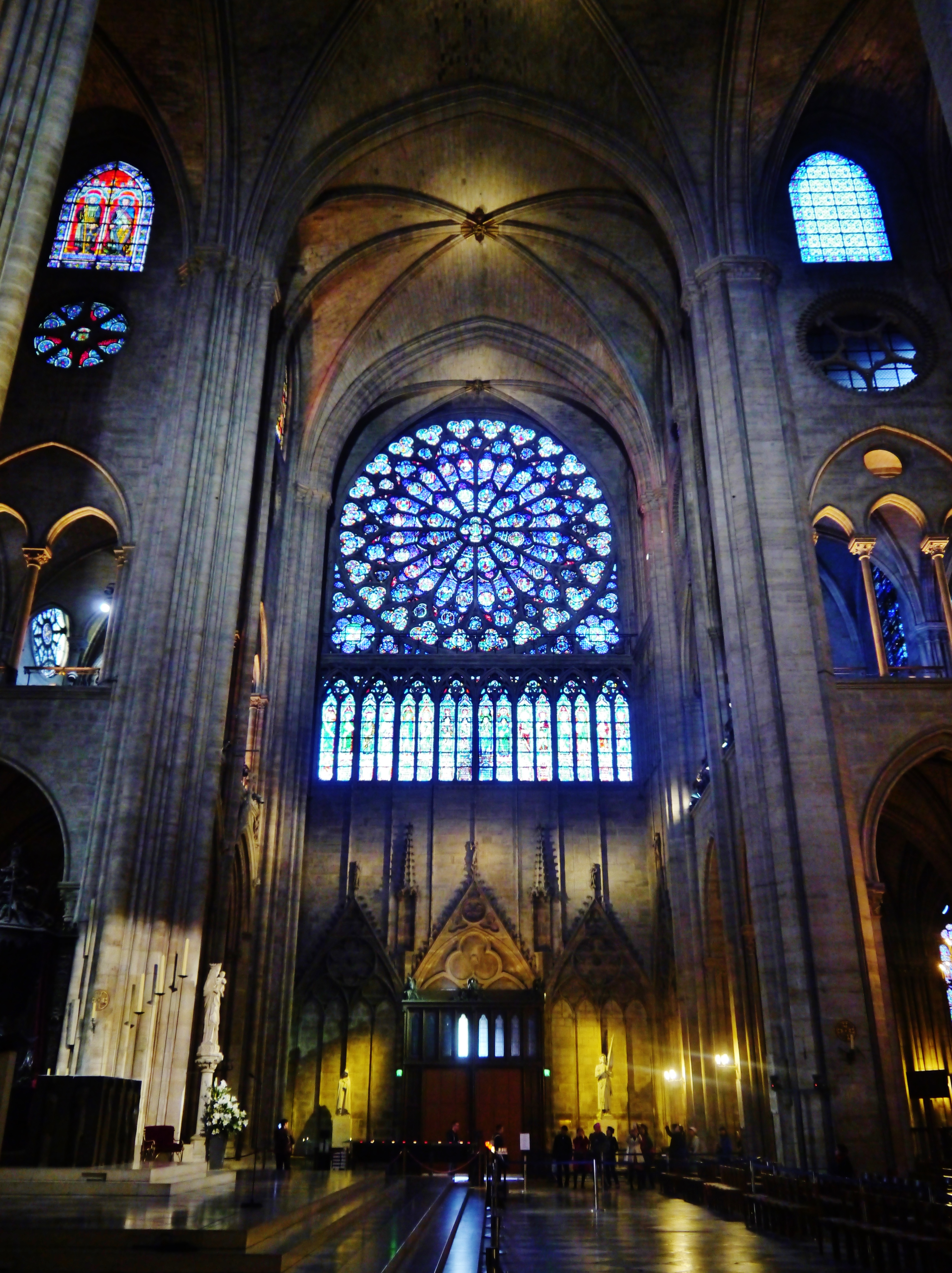
Reconstructed Early Gothic clerestories adjacent to the northern transept.

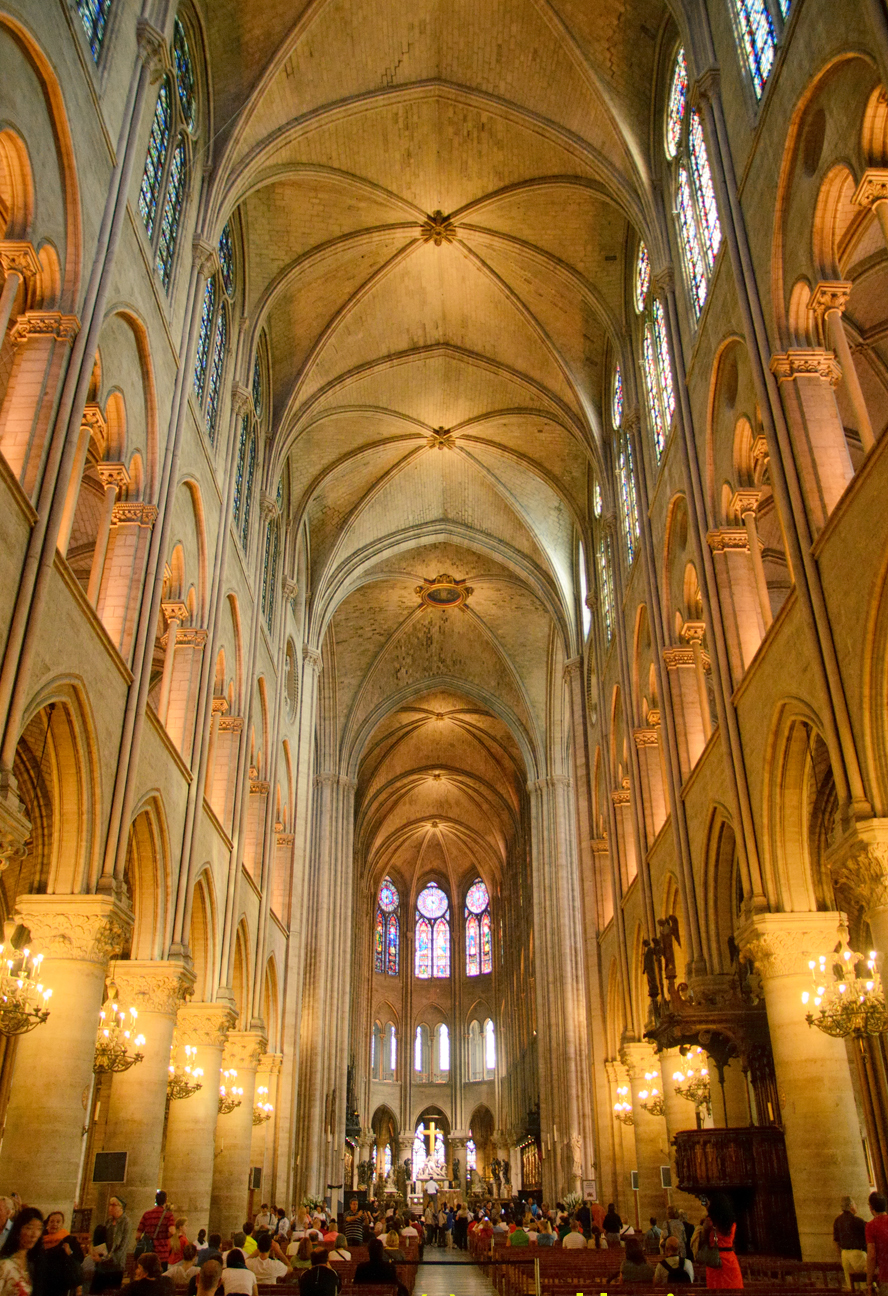
Nave looking to the east: six-part rib vaults, clerestories remodeled after 1220, three levels only.

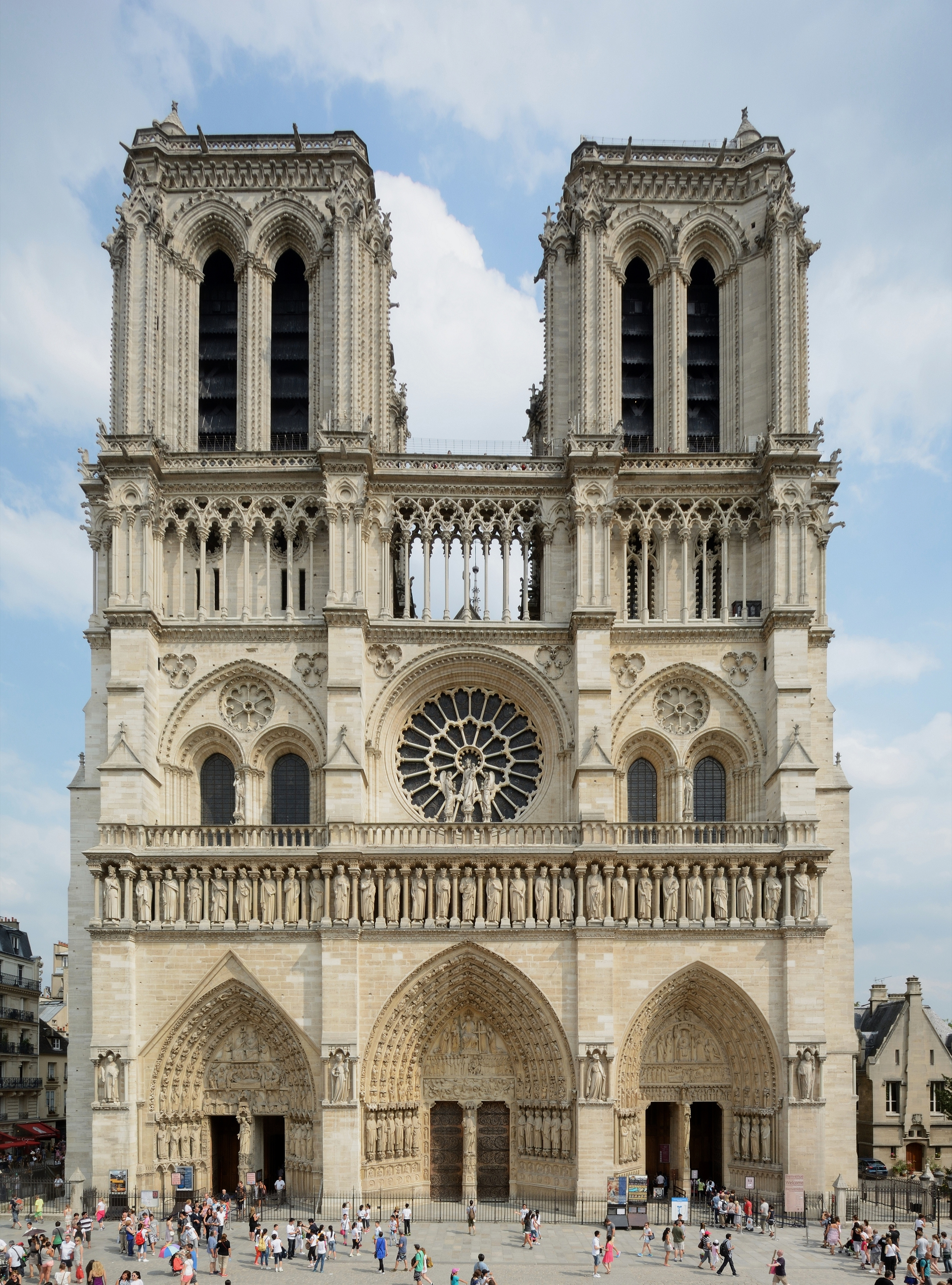
West façade: rose level built at about 1220.

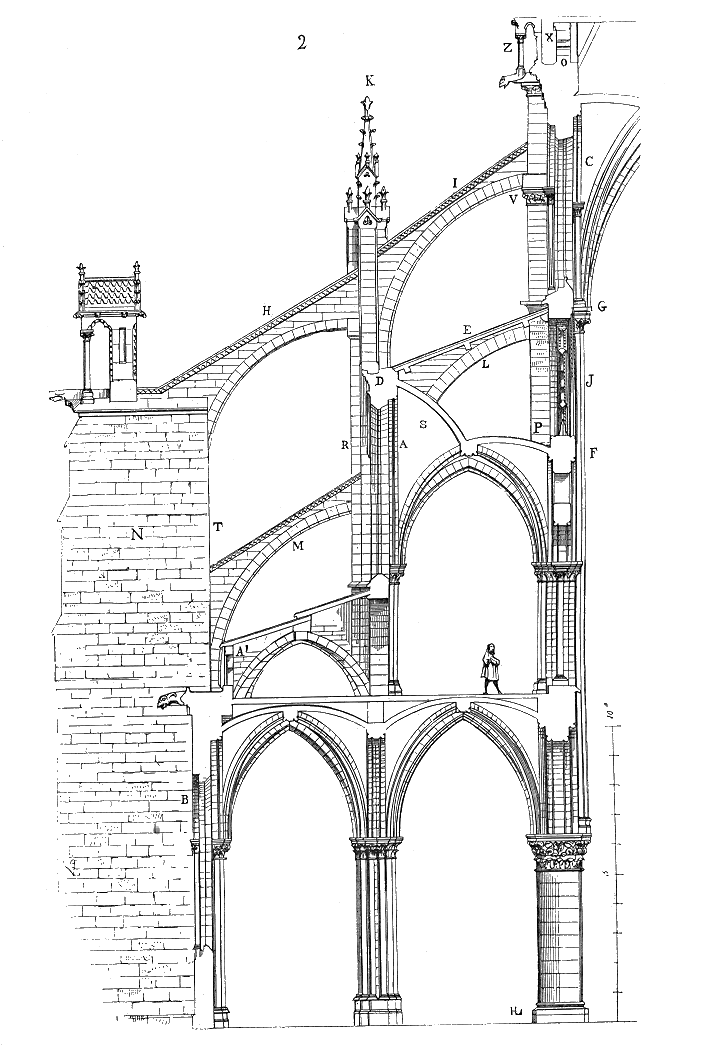
The flying buttresses of Notre Dame as they appeared in about 1220–30 (drawn by Eugène Viollet-le-Duc)

=== Chartres Cathedral (1194–1225) ===
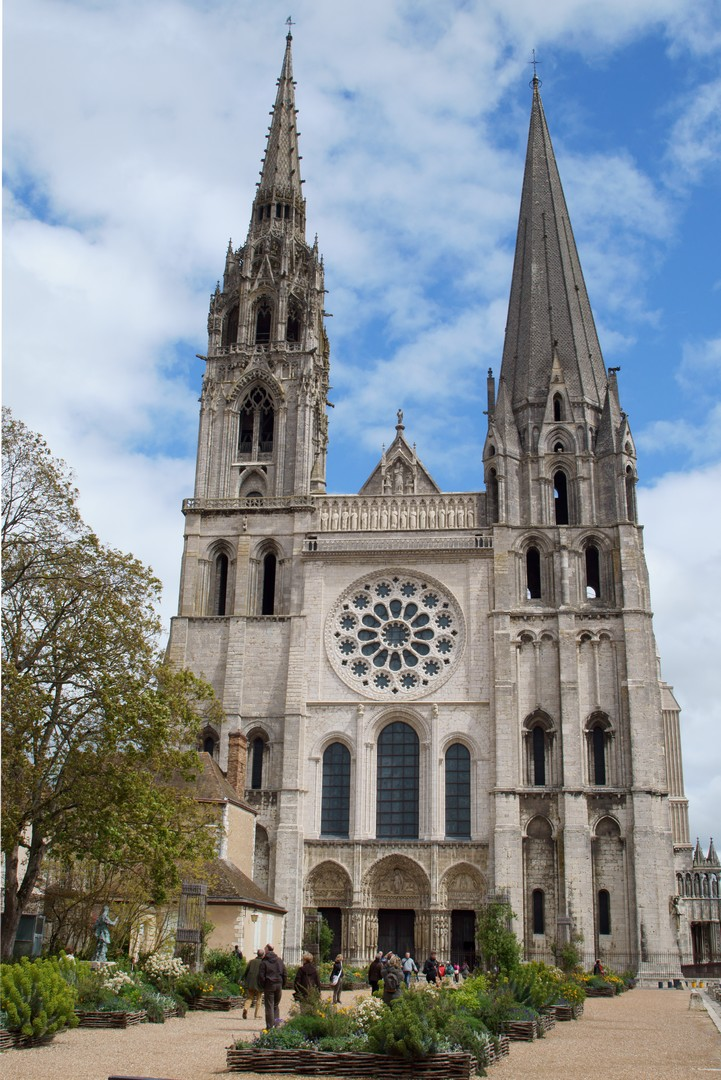
Chartres Cathedral

Chartres Cathedral was the site of four annual trade fairs on the Feast Days of the Virgin Mary and a popular pilgrimage site that displayed the reputed tunic that Mary wore when giving birth to Christ. A series of earlier cathedrals in Chartres beginning in the fourth century, were destroyed by fire. The cathedral immediately previous to the present church burned in 1194, leaving only the crypt, towers, and the recently built west front. Rebuilding began the same year, with support from the pope, the king, and the wealthy nobility and merchants of the city.

Concerning its windows (without tracery or with plate tracery), this cathedral was still an example of Early Gothic, but its elevations were innovative. Therefore Chartres Cathedral is considered the initial building of Classic Gothic. The arcades and aisles were much taller than in the first Gothic cathedrals, and the tribune were omitted. Also the clerestories were higher than in any basilica before it. Except for their lowest parts, the apse and the chapels were polygonal.

Work was nearly completed by 1225, with the architecture, glass and sculpture finished, though the seven steeples were still being rebuilt. It was not formally reconsecrated until 1260. Only a few changes were made since that time, including the addition of a new chapel dedicated to Saint Piat in 1326, and the covering of the choir columns with stucco and the addition of marble reliefs in behind the stalls in the 1750s.

The new cathedral was 130.2 meters long and 30 meters high in the nave longer and higher than Notre-Dame de Paris. Since the cathedral was constructed with the new flying buttresses, the walls were more stable, enabling the builders to eliminate the tribune level, and have more space for windows.

The lower portions of the west front (1134–1150) are Early Gothic. The north and south transepts fronts are High Gothic, as is the sculpture of the six thirteenth-century portals. The spire on the north tower is later Flamboyant. Chartres still has much of its original medieval stained glass, famous for the deep color called Chartres blue.

Chartres Cathedral

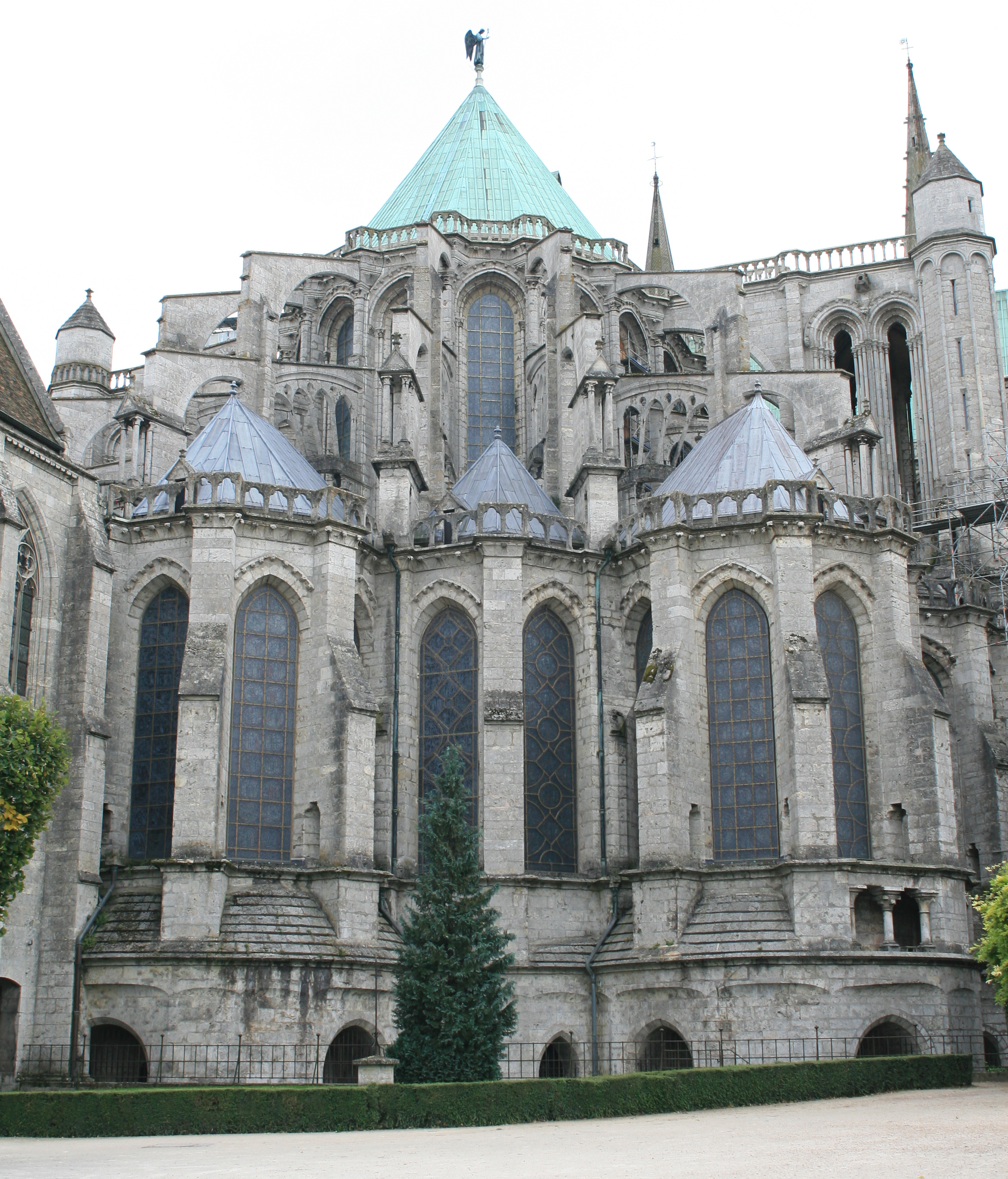
The choir and the apse chapels of Chartres Cathedral, except for the crypts already polygonal

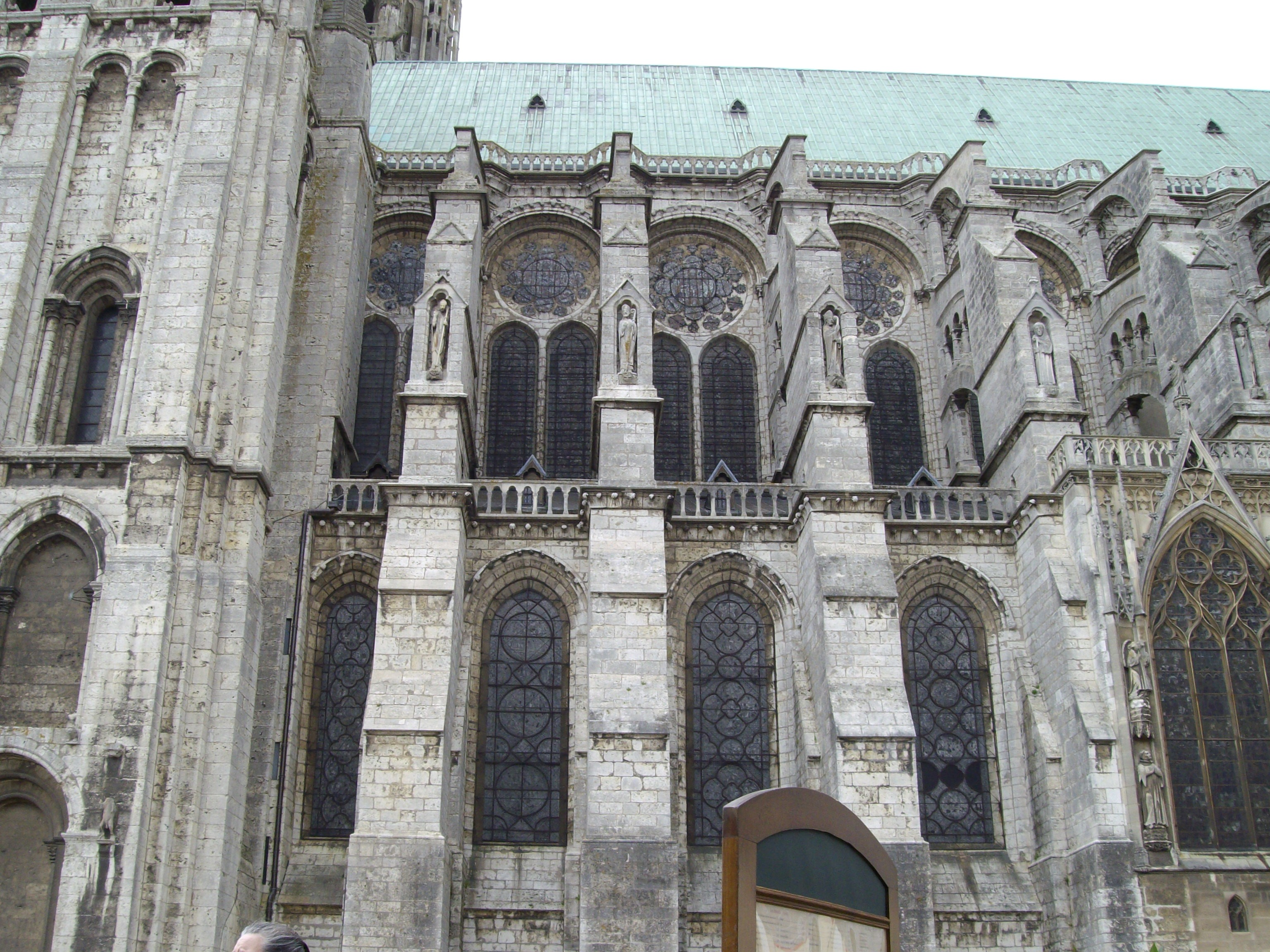
South side of the nave: No fine tracery, except for the Flamboyant window on the very right

=== Bourges Cathedral (1195–1230) ===
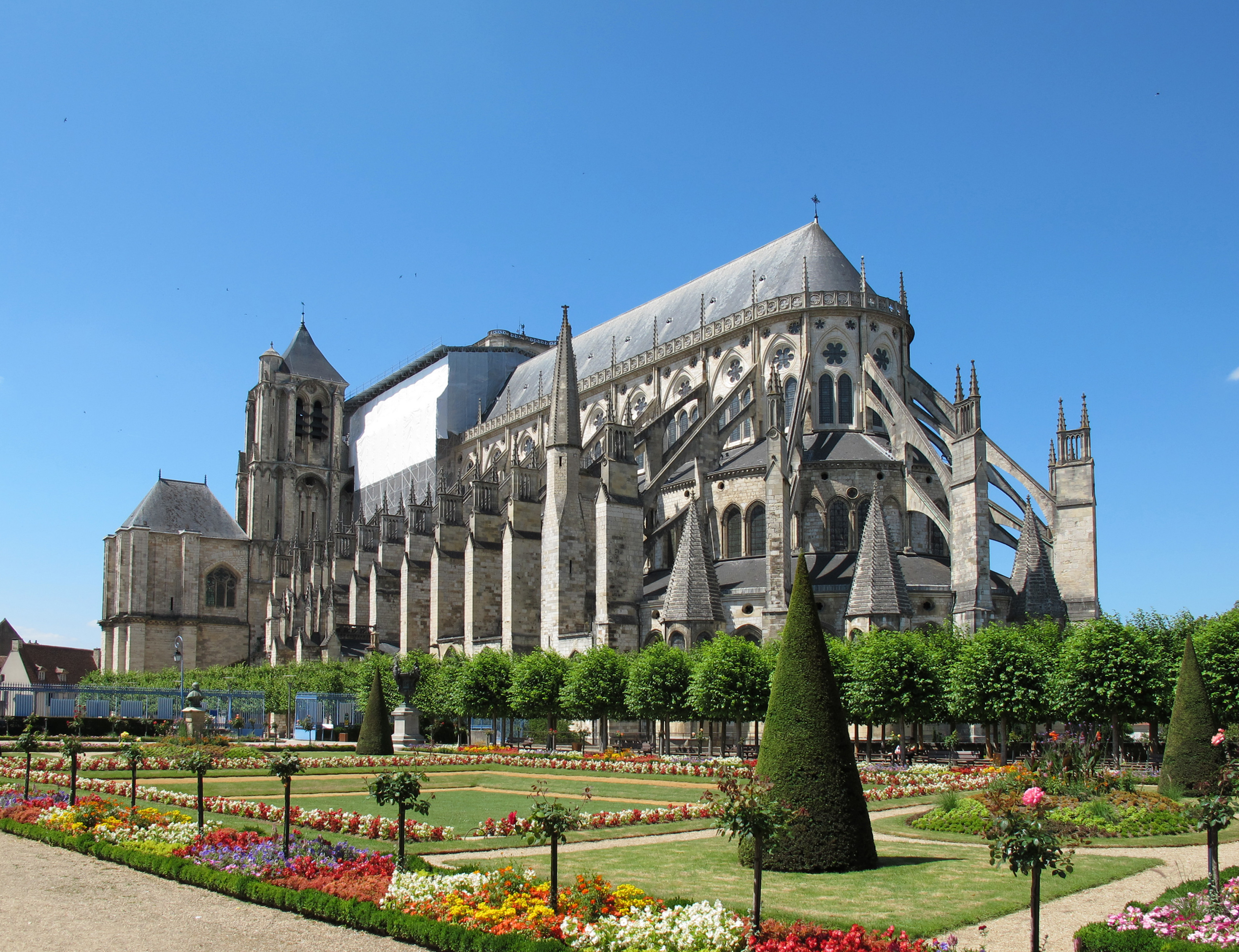
Bourges Cathedral

While most High Gothic cathedrals generally followed the Chartres plan, Bourges Cathedral took a different direction. It was built by Bishop Henri de Sully, whose brother, Eudes de Sully, was the bishop of Paris, and its construction in several ways followed Notre-Dame de Paris and not Chartres. Like Chartres, the builders simplified the vertical plan to three levels; grand arcades, triforium, and high windows. The triforium was simplified a long horizontal band, the entire length of the church. However, unlike Paris, Bourges continued to use the older six-part rib vault used in Paris. This meant that the weight of the vaults fell unevenly upon the nave, and required, like Early Gothic cathedrals, alternating strong and weak pillars. This was artfully hidden by the use of large cylindrical piers, each surrounded by eight engaged colonettes. The piers of the arcade are particularly imposing; each is 21 m (69 ft) tall. Choir and chapels of Bourges cathedral still have semicircular ends.

Since Bourges used six-part rib vaults instead of the lighter four-part vaults, the upper walls had to resist greater outward thrust, and the flying buttresses had to be more effective. The Bourges buttresses used a unique design with a particularly acute angle, which gave it the necessary force, but it was also reinforced by thicker and stronger walls than Chartres.

The predominant sensation at Bourges is not only great height, but great length and interior space; the cathedral is 120 m (390 ft) long, without a transept or other interruption. The most unusual feature of Bourges Cathedral is the arrangement of vertical height; each part of the elevation is set back, like steps, with the highest roof and vaults over the central aisle. The outermost aisles have vaults nine meters high; the intermediate aisles have vaults 21.3 m (70 ft) high; and the center aisle has vaults 37.5 m (123 ft) high.

Many later Gothic cathedrals followed the Chartres model, but several were influenced by Bourges, including Le Mans Cathedral, the modified Beauvais Cathedral, and Toledo Cathedral in Spain, which copied the system of vaults of different heights.

Bourges Cathedral

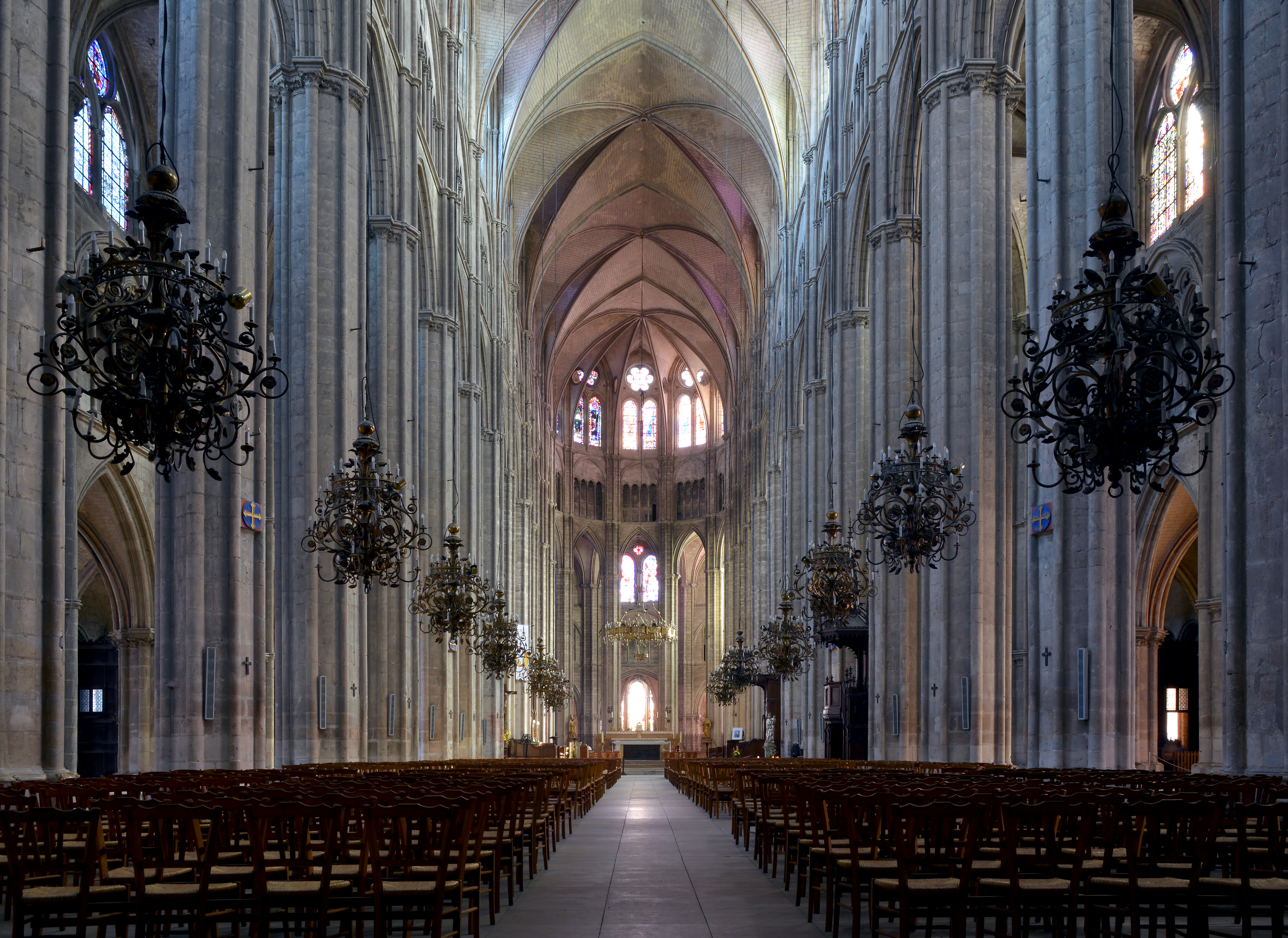
Nave, with 21-meter-high piers of the grand arcades

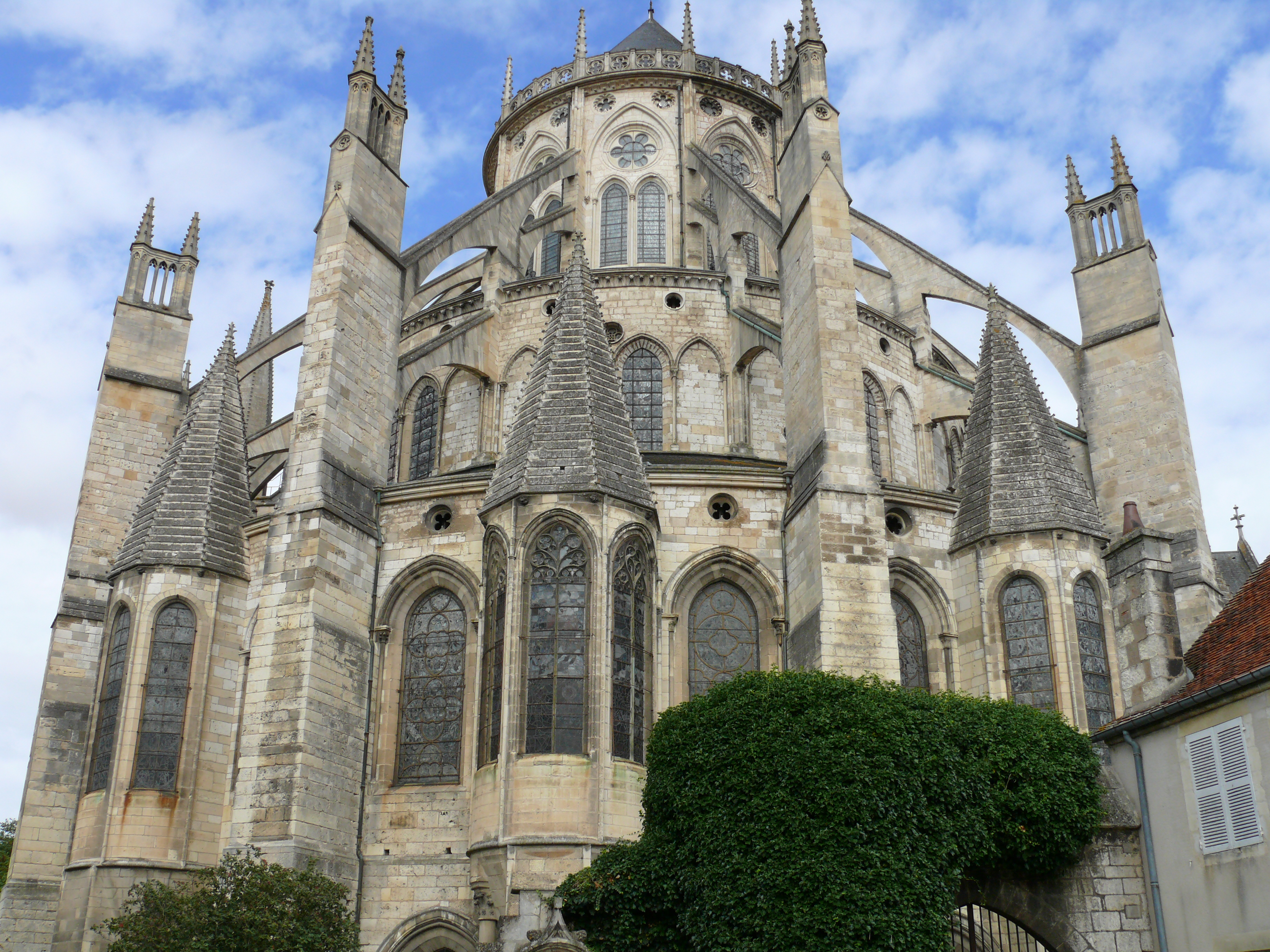
The chevet, all windows without tracery.

== Angevin Gothic ==
Most buildings of Plantagenet style, also called Angevin Gothic, by dating and by shape are part of early Gothic. In the reconstruction of Angers Cathedral begun by bishop Normand de Doué, 1148–1152, the first Angevin vault were constructed. Poitiers Cathedral, erected since 1166 is known as the first Gothic hall church. Its eastern parts are Early Gothic with some Romanesque elements; its western parts have High Gothic tracery.

== Early Classic or High Gothic ==
Some notable examples of Classic Gothic and High Gothic cathedrals, such as Chartres Cathedral (see above) and Bourges Cathedral also have elements of Early Gothic architecture.

== Early Gothic in Normandy ==
Experiments with Gothic features were also underway in Normandy in the late 11th and 12th centuries. In 1098 Lessay Abbey was given an early version of the pointed rib vault in the choir. The church of Saint-Pierre de Lisieux, begun in the 1170s, featured the more modern four-part rib vaults and flying buttresses. Other experiments with Gothic rib vaults and other features took place in Caen, in the churches of the two large royal abbeys churches, the Abbey of Saint-Étienne, Caen and the Abbey of Sainte-Trinité, Caen, but they remained essentially Norman Romanesque churches.

Rouen Cathedral had notable early Gothic features, added when the interior was reconstructed from Romanesque to Gothic by archbishop Gautier de Coutances beginning in 1185. The new Gothic nave was given four levels, while the later choir had the newly fashionable three.

== English Early Gothic ==
=== Durham Cathedral (1093-1130) ===
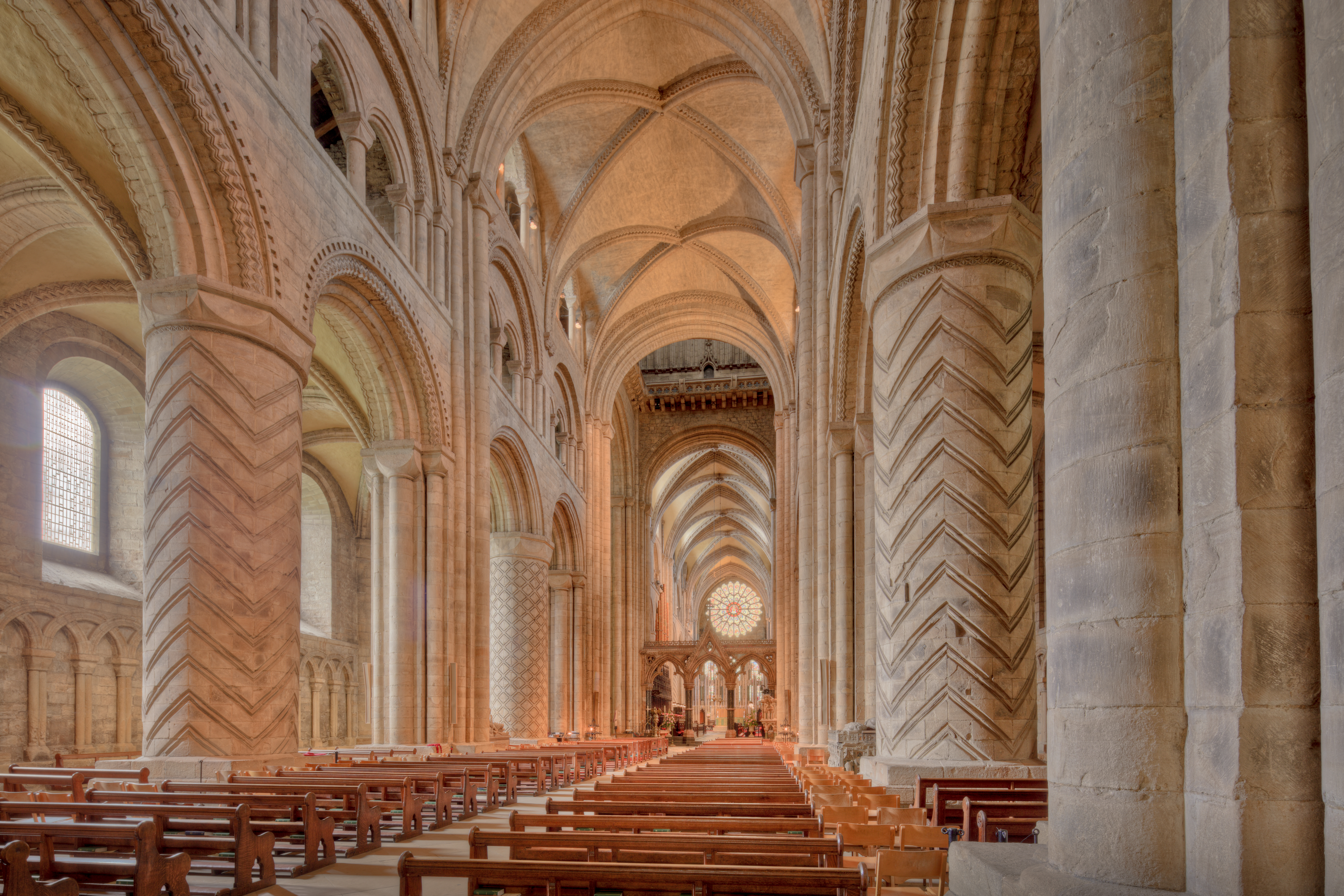
Durham Cathedral nave with reconstructed choir vaults in the distance (c.1235)

English architects had experimented with early Gothic features. At Durham Cathedral, a Romanesque church, not just the aisles but also the central vessel of the choir were covered with rib vaults in 1093–96, probably the first high rib vaults in Europe. As the work continued, the builders experimented with an even bolder variation, using pointed instead of rounded arches, to transfer the weight downwards. The new pointed rib vaults were installed over the south transept and nave beginning in 1130. Due to their experimental nature, the first choir vaults were not successful; the thin panels between the ribs were made of plastered rubble, and were too heavy and cracked, and in 1235 they had to be replaced. Newer and lighter versions of the rib vault, using small pieces of cut stone in the panels, rather than plastered rubble, were developed in Normandy and the Ile-de-France. Pointed rib vaults did not fully take hold in England until the second half of the 12th century.

=== Canterbury Cathedral (1174-1184) ===
One of the first major buildings in England to use the new style was Canterbury Cathedral. A fire destroyed the mainly Romanesque choir in September 1174, and leading architects from England and France were invited to offer plans for its reconstruction. The winner of this competition was a French master builder, William of Sens, who had been involved in the construction of Sens Cathedral, the first complete Gothic cathedral in France.

Many limitations were put upon William of Sens by the monks who ran the cathedral. He was not allowed to replace entirely the original Norman church, and had to fit his new structure on the old crypt and within the surviving outer Norman walls. Nonetheless, he achieved a strikingly original sculpture, showing elements inspired by Notre-Dame de Paris and Laon Cathedral. Following the French model, he used six-part rib vaults, pointed arches, supporting columns with carved acanthus leaf decoration, and a semi-circular ambulatory. However, other elements were purely English, such as the use of dark Purbeck marble to create decorative contrasts with the pale stone brought from Normandy. The work was described by a monk and chronicler, Gervase of Canterbury. Contrasting the old with the new choir. He wrote: "There, the arches and everything else was plain, or sculpted with an axe and not with a chisel. But here almost throughout is appropriate sculpture. There used to be no marble shafts, but here are innumerable ones. There in the circuit round the choir, the vaults were plain, but here they are arch-ribbed and have key-stones."

William of Sens fell from a scaffolding in 1178 and was seriously injured, and returned to France, where he died, and his work was continued by an English architect, William the Englishman, who constructed the Trinity Chapel in the apse and the Corona in the east end, which were monuments to Thomas Becket, who had been murdered in the cathedral. The new structure had many French features, such as the doubled columns in the Trinity chapel, and piers replaced by Purbeck-marble wall shafts. But it also retained many specifically English features, such as a great variety in the level and placement of the spaces; the Trinity chapel, for example is sixteen steps above the Choir). It also retaining rather than eliminated the transepts - Canterbury had two. Early English Gothic put an emphasis on great length; Canterbury was doubled in length between 1096 and 1130.

One reason for the differences between French and English Gothic was that French Benedictine abbey-churches usually put different functions into separate buildings, while in England they were usually combined in the same structure. Similar complicated multifunctional designs were found not only in Canterbury, but in the abbey-churches of Bath, Coventry, Durham, Ely, Norwich, Rochester, Winchester and Worcester.

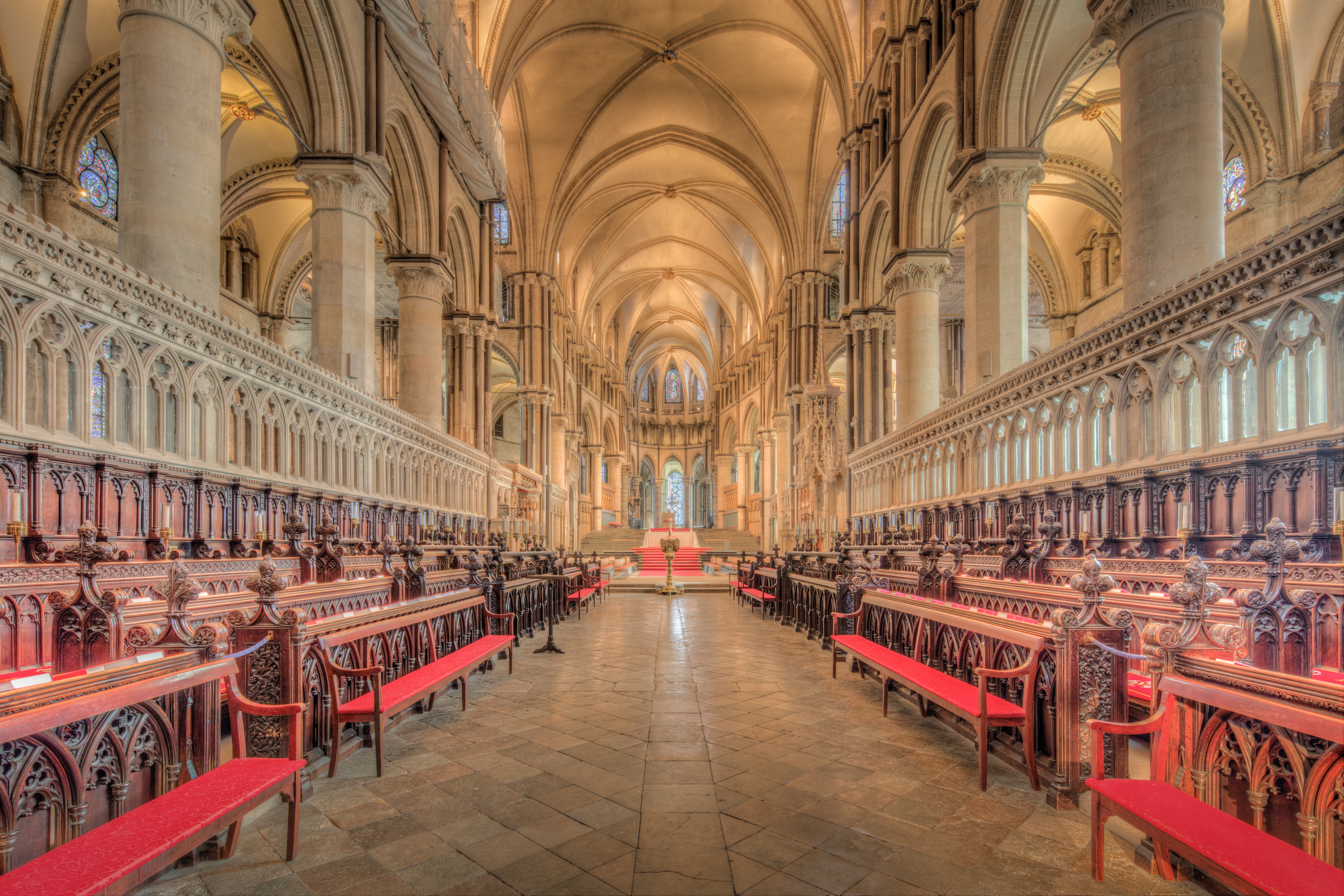
Choir of Canterbury Cathedral rebuilt by William of Sens (1174–1184)

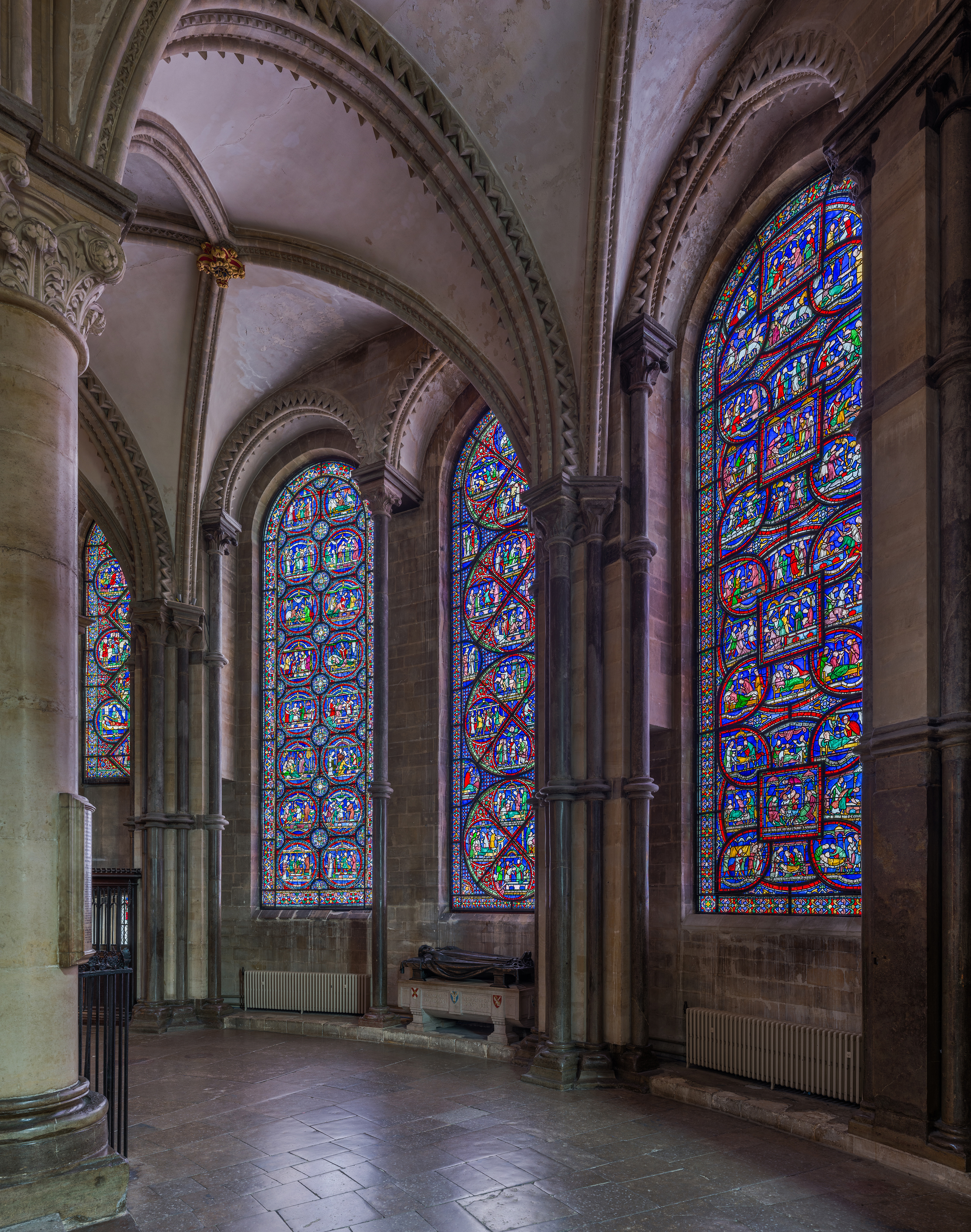
The windows and vaults of Trinity Chapel, Canterbury Cathedral

=== The Cistercian abbeys ===
Another notable form of early English Gothic architecture was that of the Cistercian monasteries. The Cistercian order had been formed in 1098 as a reaction against the opulence and ornament of the Benedictine order and its monasteries. The architecture of the Cistercians was based upon simplicity and functionality. All decoration was forbidden. The Cistercian monasteries were in remote locations, far from the cities. They were closed in 1539 during the reign of Henry VIII, and now are picturesque ruins. Examples include Kirkstall Abbey (c. 1152); Roche Abbey (c. 1172), and Fountains Abbey (c. 1132) all in Yorkshire.

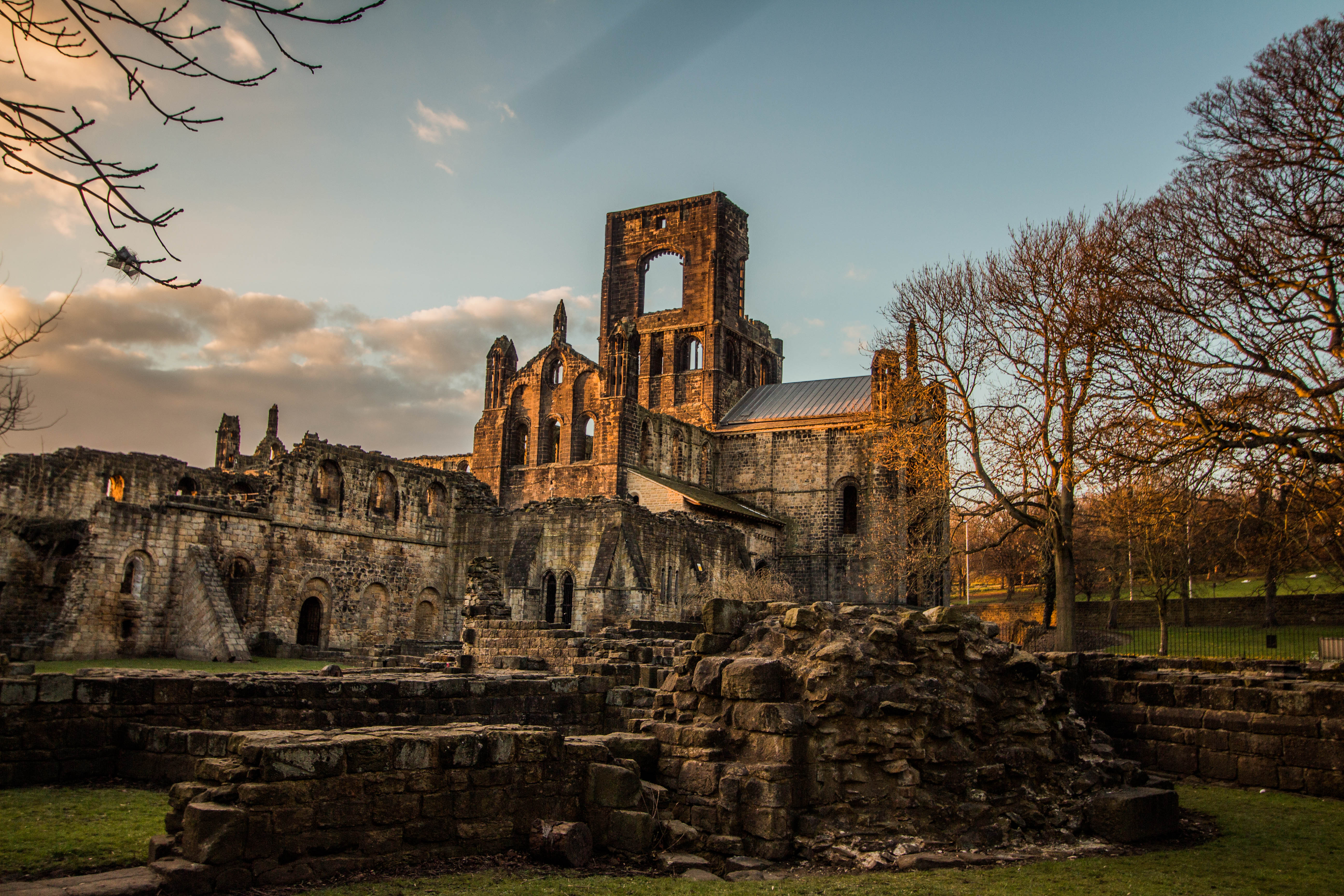
Kirkstall Abbey, West Yorkshire (c. 1152)

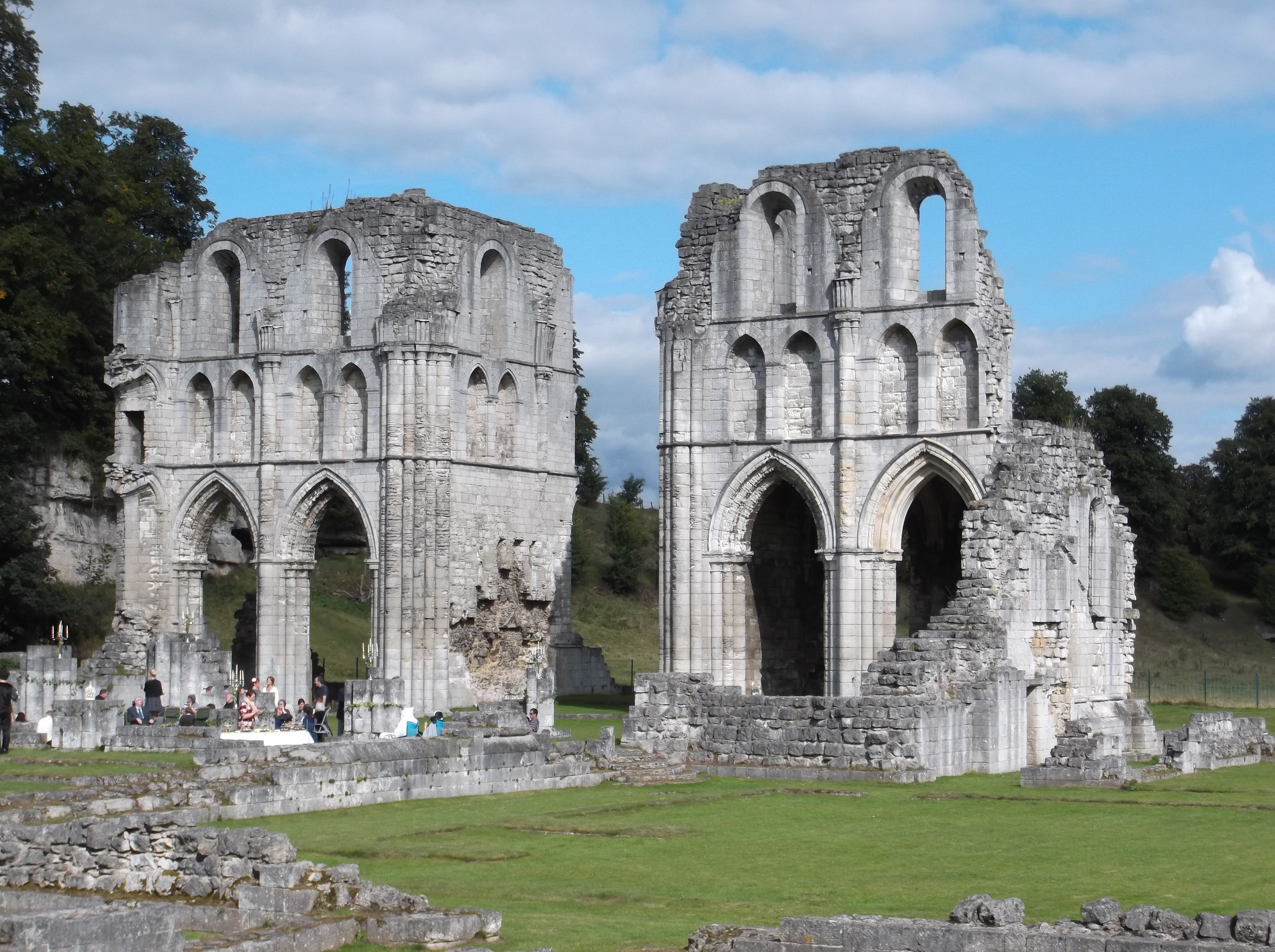
Roche Abbey, South Yorkshire (c. 1172)

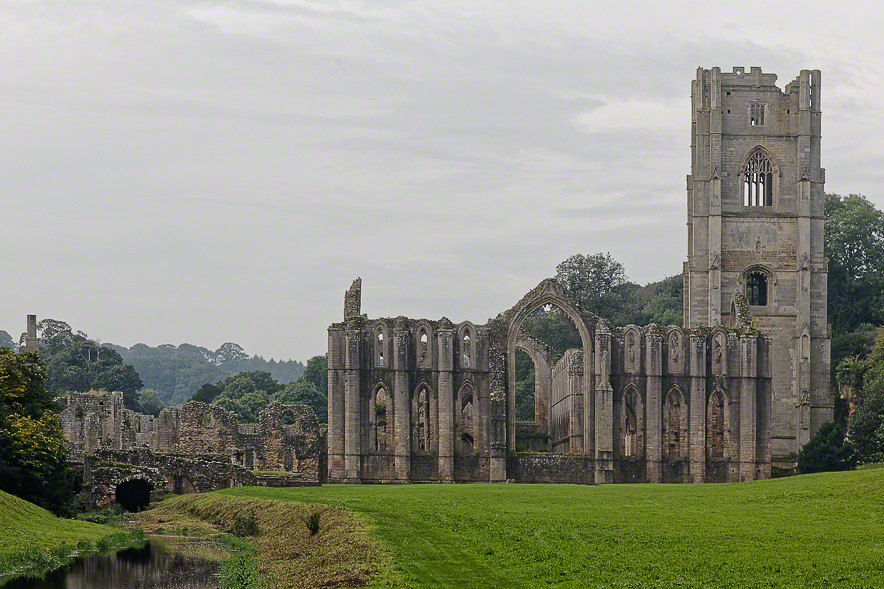
Fountains Abbey, North Yorkshire (c. 1132)

=== Wells Cathedral ===
Wells Cathedral, (built between 1185–1200 and modified until 1240) is another leading example of the early English style. It borrowed some aspects, such as its elevation, from the French style, but gave precedence to strong horizontals, such as the triforium, rather than the dominant vertical elements, such as wall shafts, of the French style. The piers were composed of as many as twenty-four shafts, adding another unusual decorative effect. The north porch, built in 1210–15, and especially the west front (1220–1240) had a particularly novel decorative effect. The screen facade of the west front is filled with nearly four hundred carved and painted stone figure, and is made more impressive by two flanking towers, attached to but not part of the body of the church. This arrangement was adapted by other English cathedrals, including Salisbury Cathedral and Exeter Cathedral.

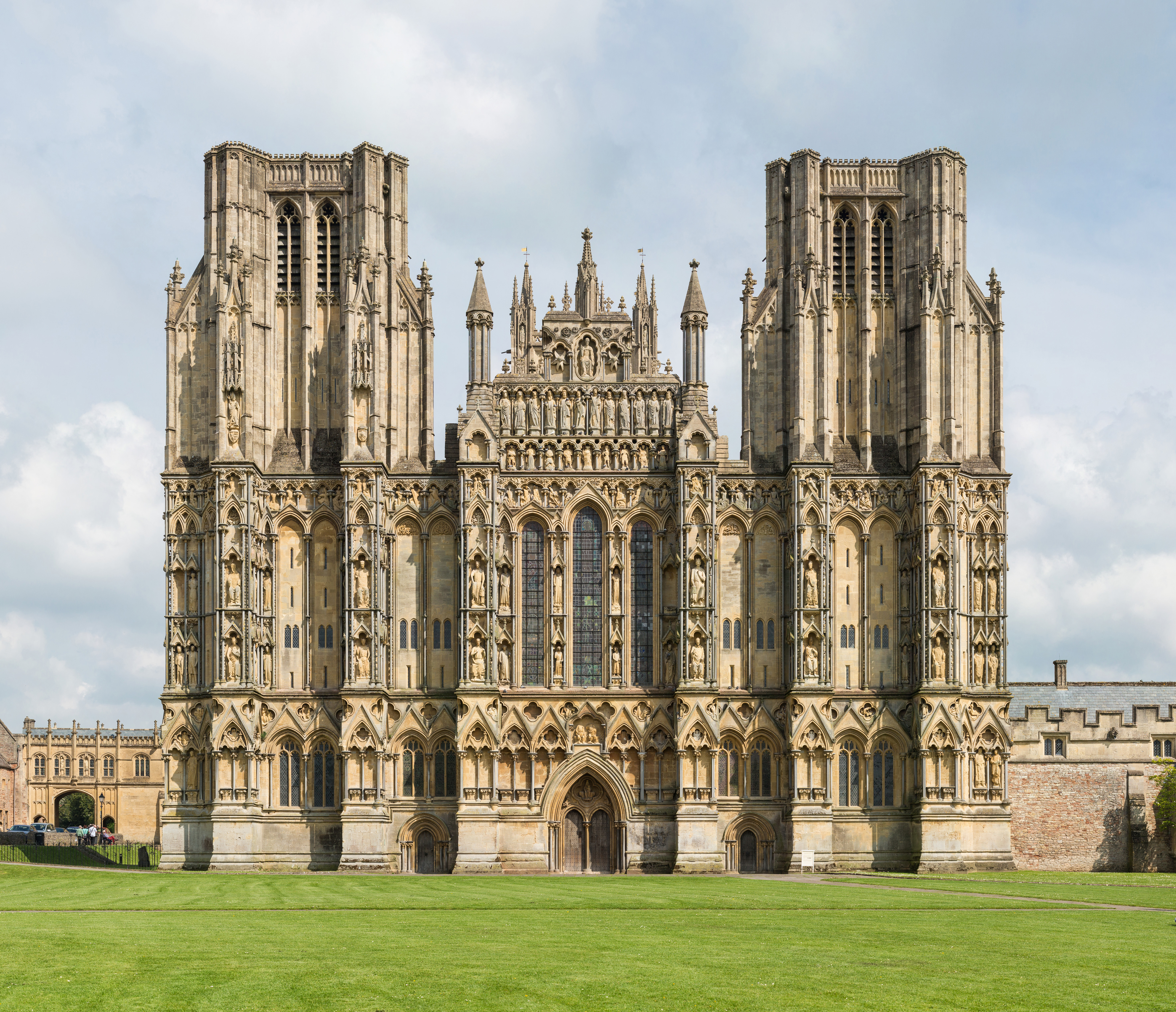
West front of Wells Cathedral (1220–1240)

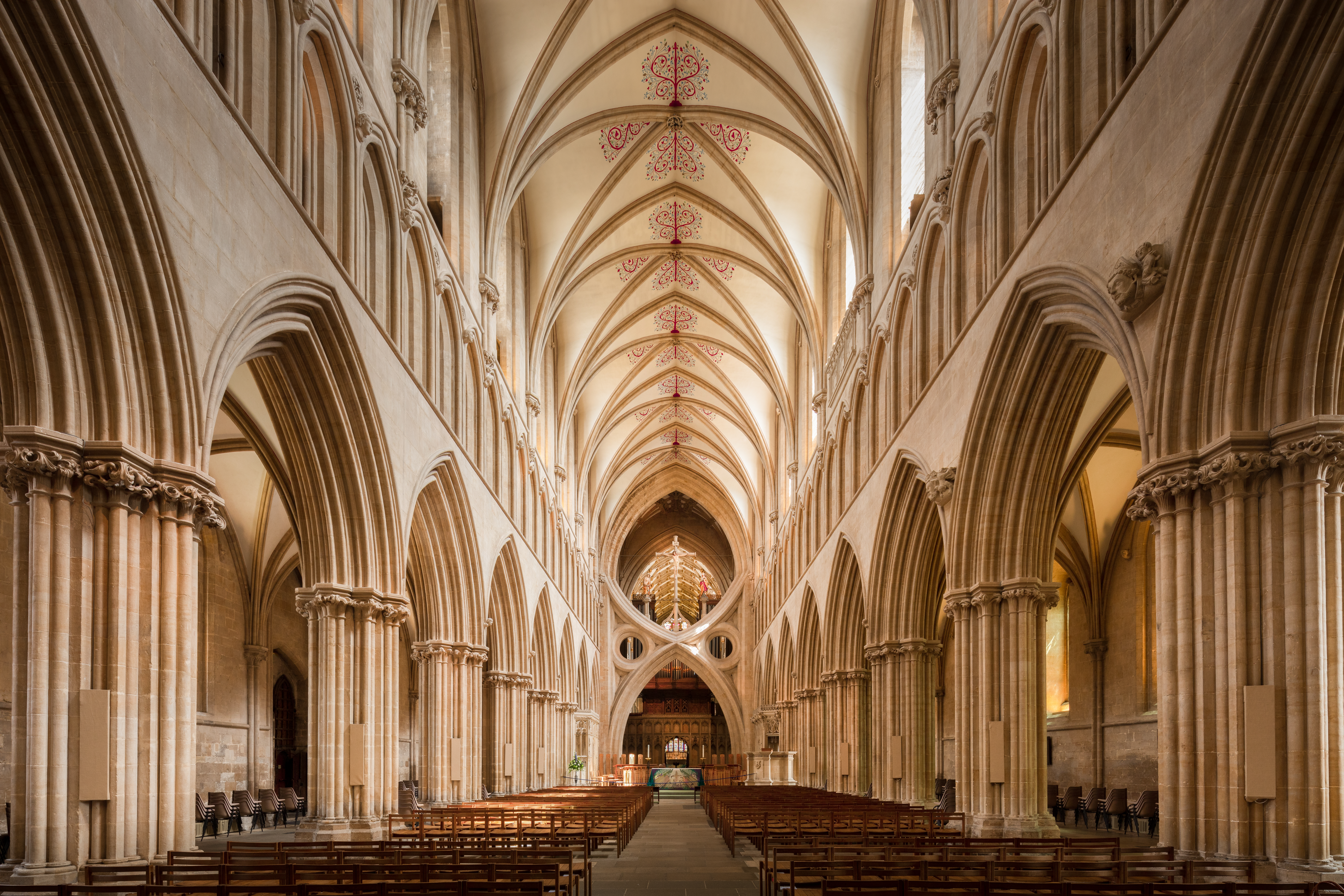
Nave of Wells Cathedral, with its strong horizontal emphasis. The unusual double arch was added in 1338 to reinforce the support of the tower.

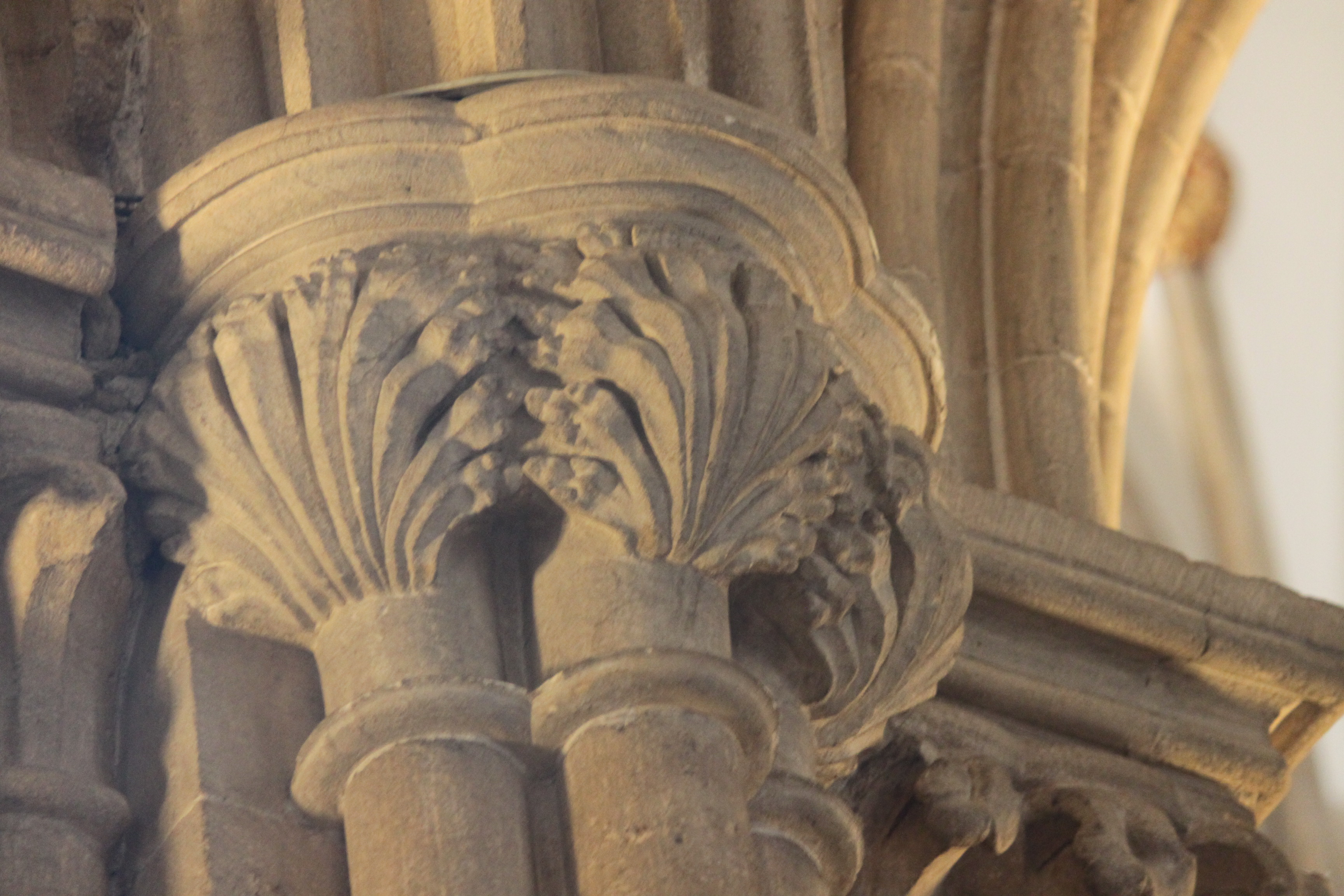
Detail of the sculpted capitals of clustered columns in the nave

=== Salisbury Cathedral ===
Salisbury Cathedral (1220–1260) is another example of the mature Early English Gothic. Salisbury is best known for its famous crossing tower and spire, added in the 14th century, but its complex plan, with two sets of transepts, a projecting north porch and a rectangular east end, is a classic example of the early English Gothic. It was a distinct contrast from the French Amiens Cathedral, begun the same year, with its simple apse on east and its minimal transepts. The nave has strong horizontal lines created by the contrast of the dark Purbeck marble columns. The Lady Chapel of Salisbury has extremely slender pillars of Purbeck marble supporting the vaults, shows the diversity and harmony of mature English Early Gothic, entering the period of Decorated Gothic.

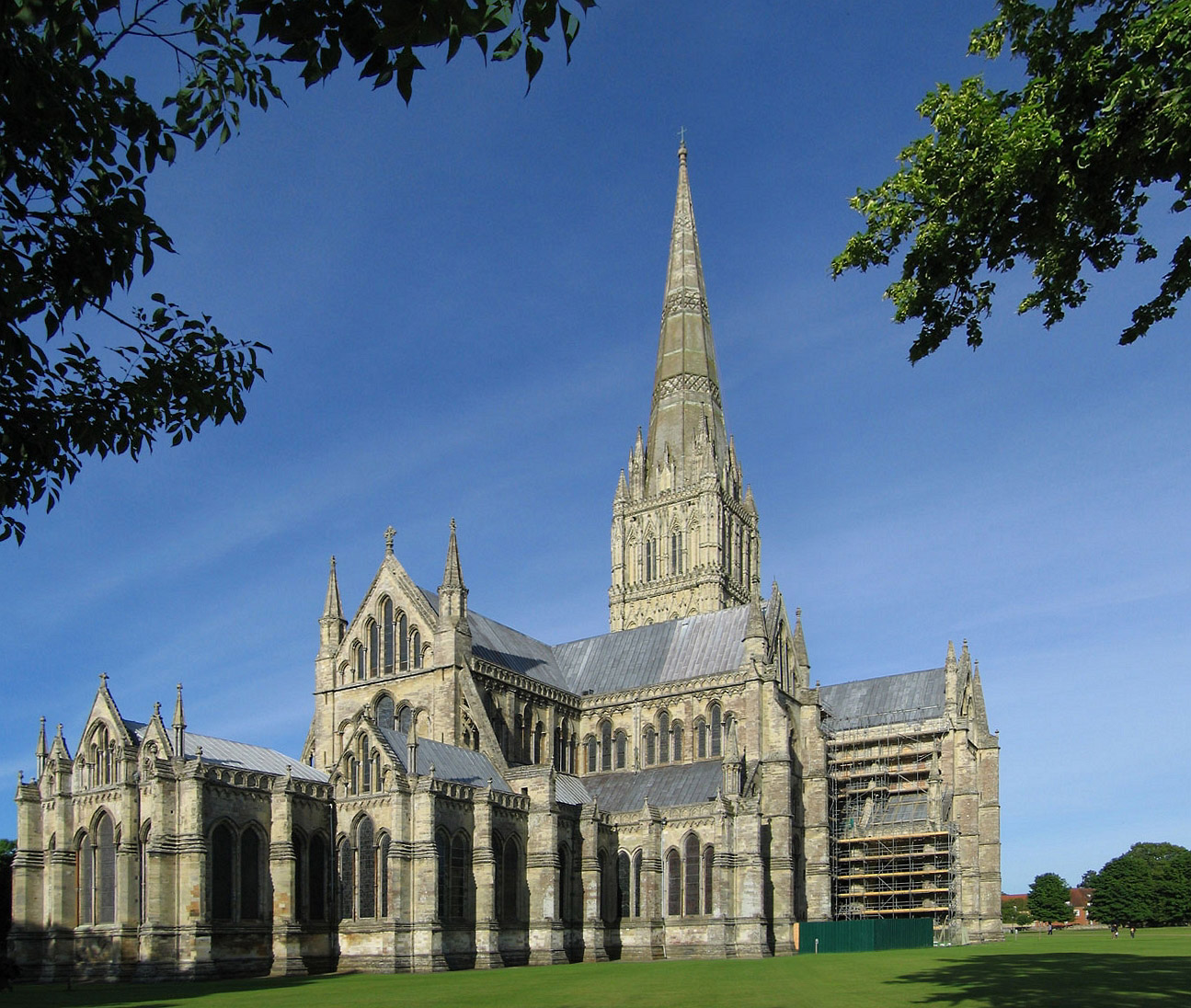
The sprawling plan of Salisbury Cathedral (1220–1260), with its multiple transepts and projecting porch

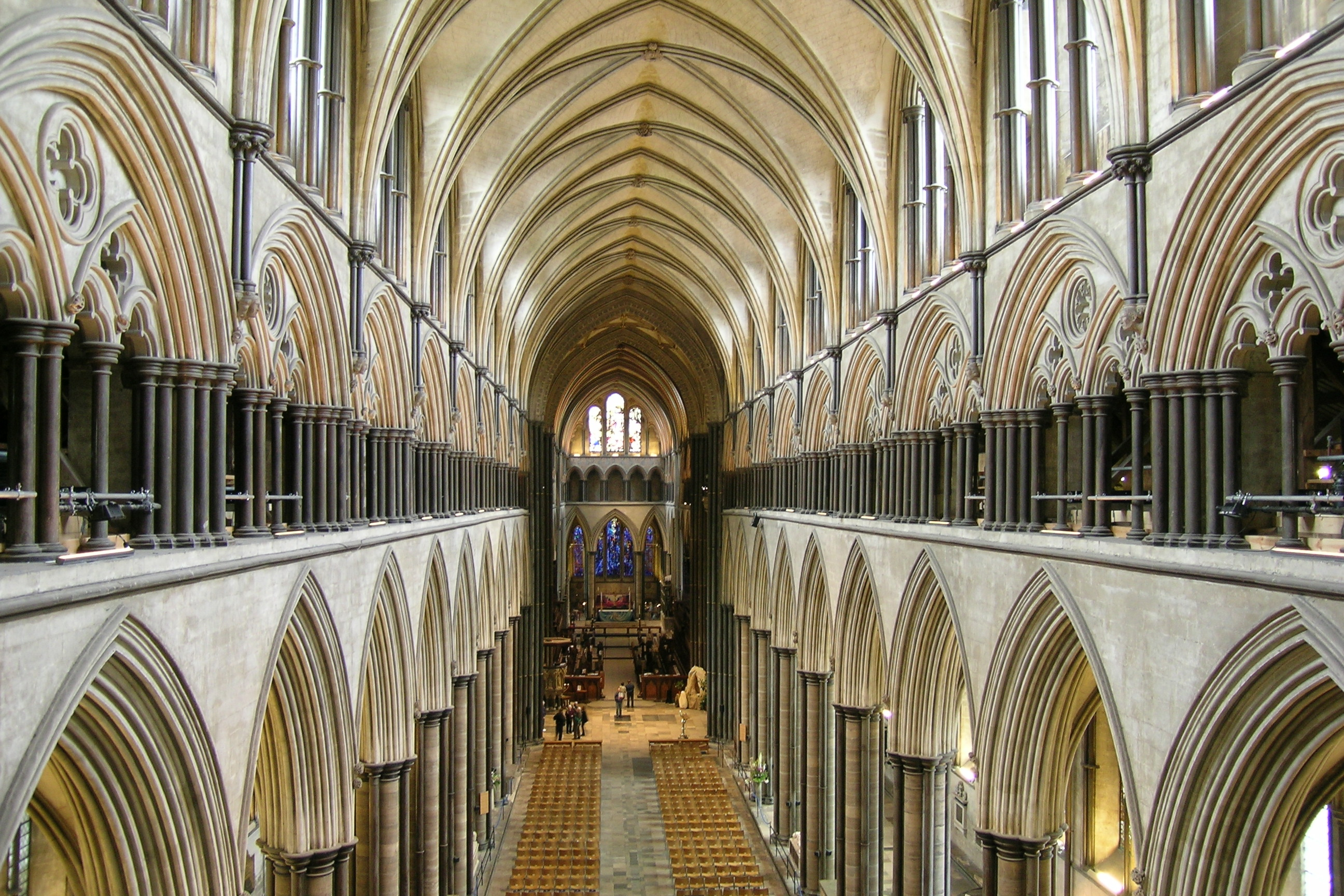
The nave of Salisbury Cathedral, with its strong horizontal lines of dark Purbeck marble columns

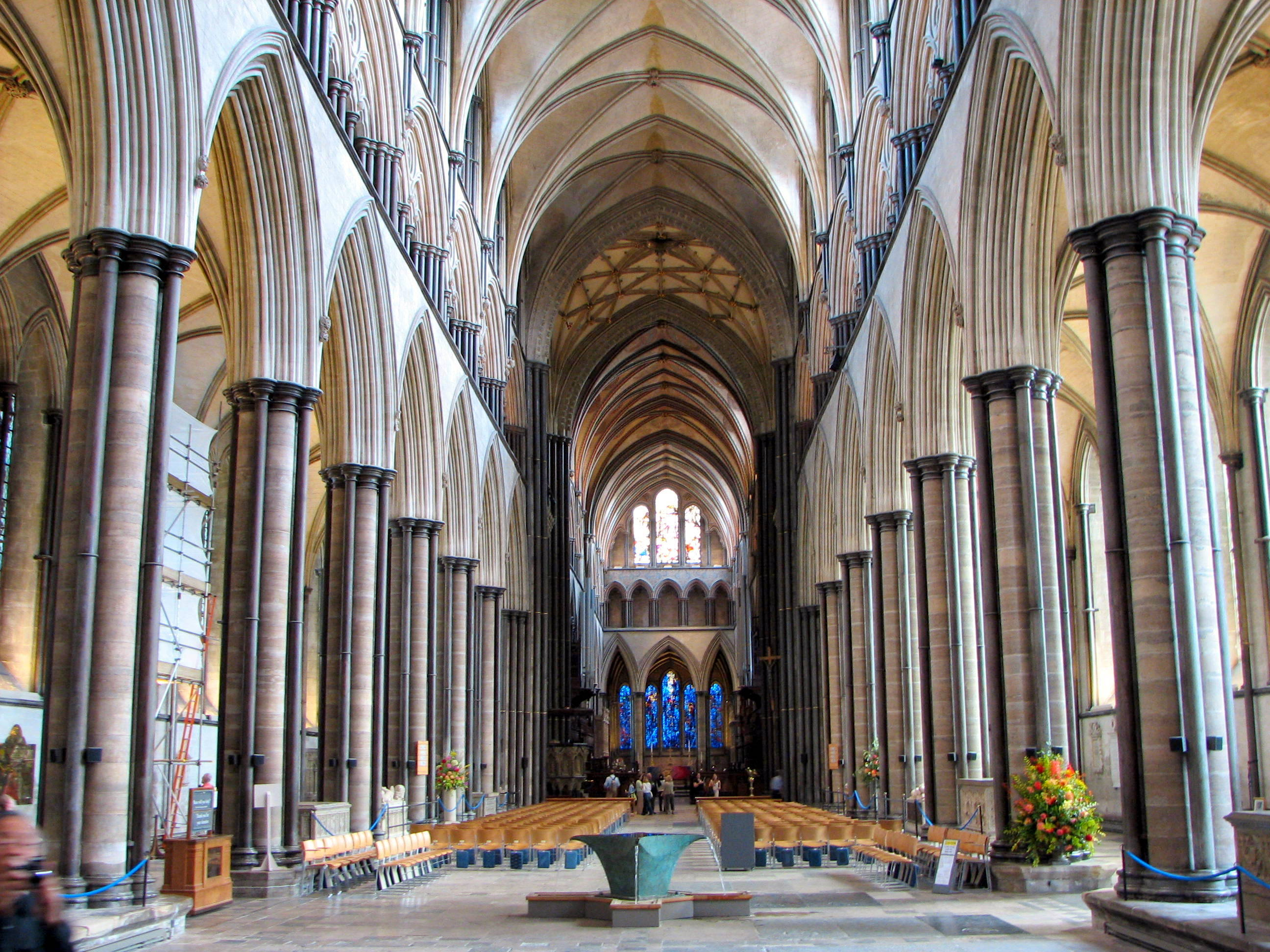
The choir of Salisbury Cathedral

=== Lincoln Cathedral ===
Lincoln Cathedral (rebuilt from the Norman style beginning in 1192), is the best example of the fully mature early Gothic style. The master-builder, Geoffrey de Noiers, was French, but he constructed a church with distinct non-French features; double transepts, an elongated nave, complexity of interior space, and a more lavish use of decorative features. St. Hugh's Choir, named after the French-born monk St. Hugh of Lincoln, was a good example. The choir was covered with a rib vault in which most of the ribs had a purely decorative role. In addition to the functional ribs, it featured extra ribs called tiercerons, which did not lead to the central point of the vault, but to a point along the ridge rib on the crown of the vault. They were put together in lavish designs, which gave the resulting ceiling the nickname "The crazy vault."

Another distinctive English element introduced at Lincoln was the use of s the blind arcade (also known as a blank arcade) in the decoration of Hugh's chapel. Two layers of arcades with pointed arches are attached to the walls, giving a theatrical effect of three dimensions. This element is enhanced by the use of different color stone for the thin columns; ribs of white limestone for the lower columns and black Purbeck marble for the upper portions.

A third feature important feature of Lincoln was the thick or double-shell wall. This was an Anglo-Romanesque feature, which earlier had been in used in Romanesque structures of Caen, and in Durham and Winchester Cathedral. Instead of being supported only by flying buttresses, the vaults receive additional support from the thicker walls of the gallery over the aisles. This allowed a considerably wider span across the nave, and also meant that the vaults could have additional purely decorative ribs, as in the "Crazy vault".

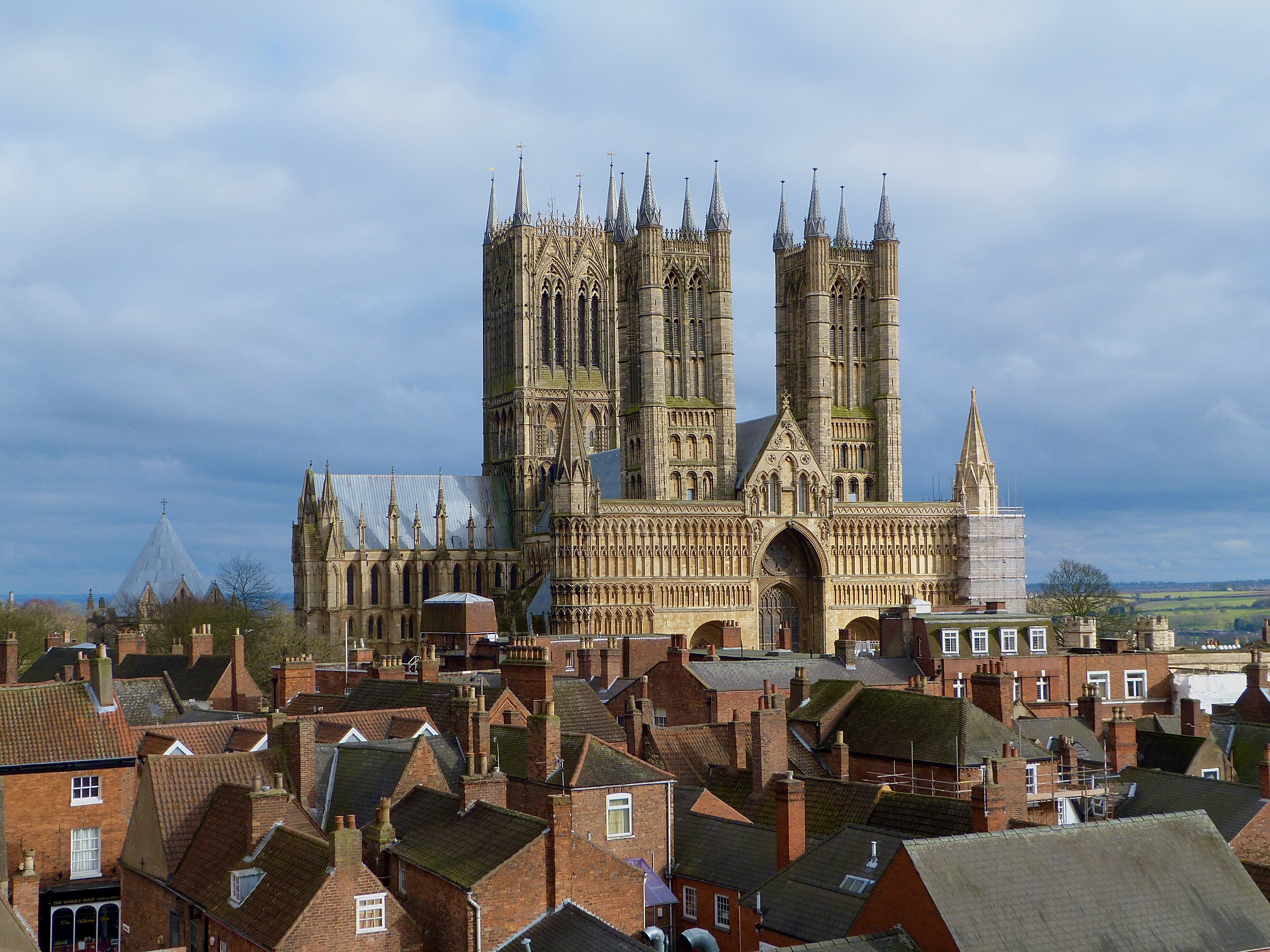
Lincoln Cathedral (rebuilt beginning in 1192)

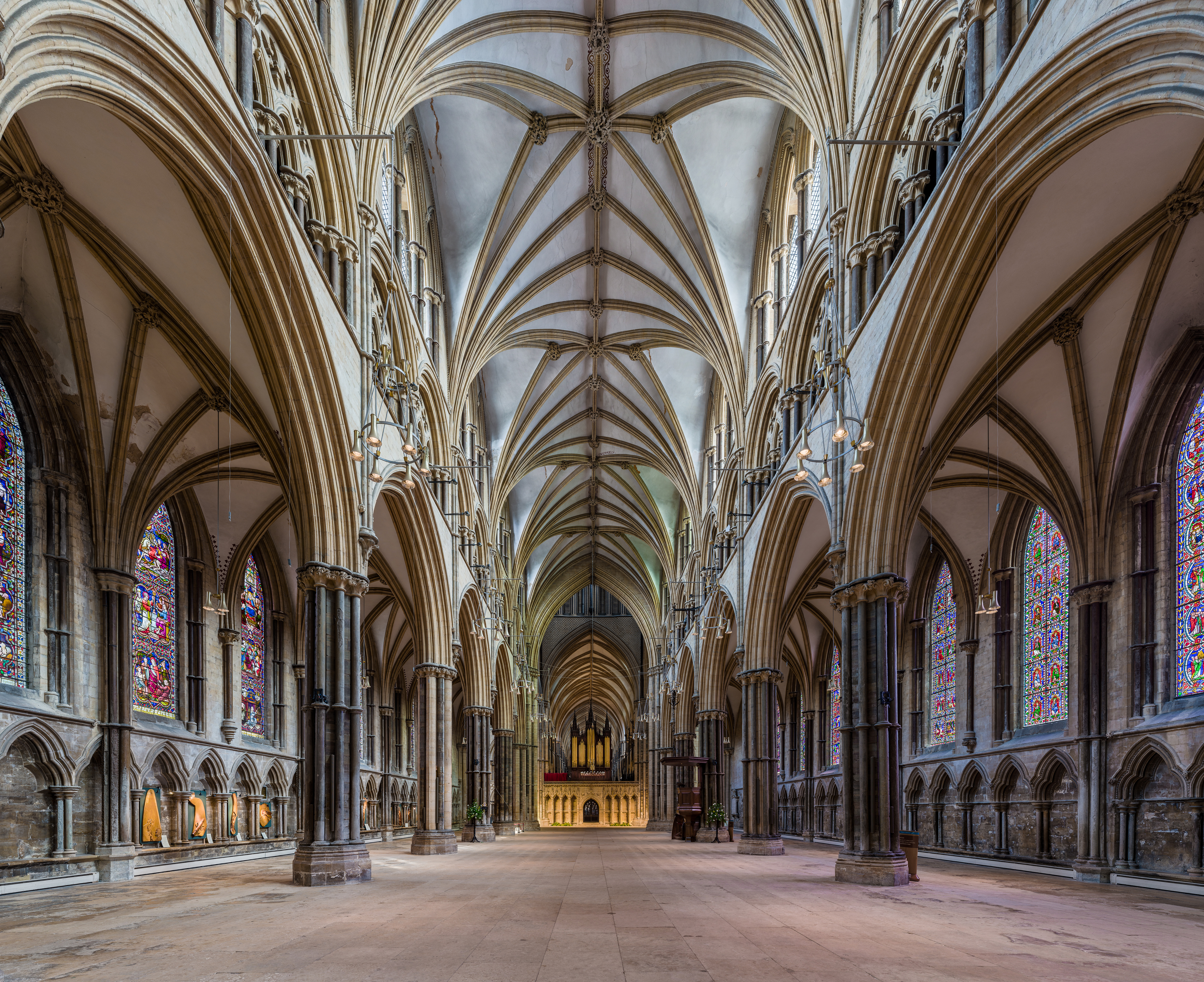
The wide nave of Lincoln Cathedral

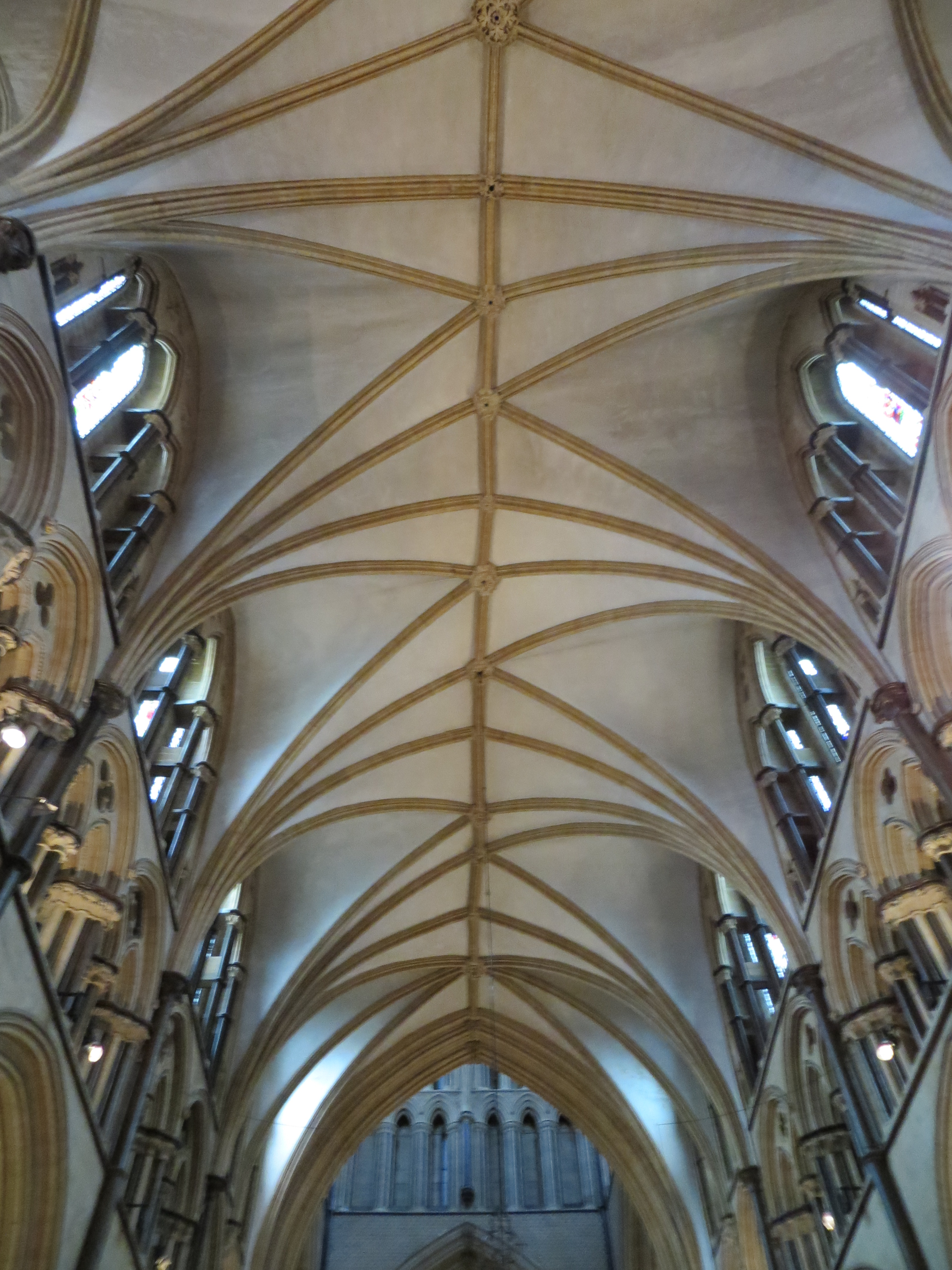
The "Crazy Vaults" of the St. Hugh's choir of Lincoln Cathedral

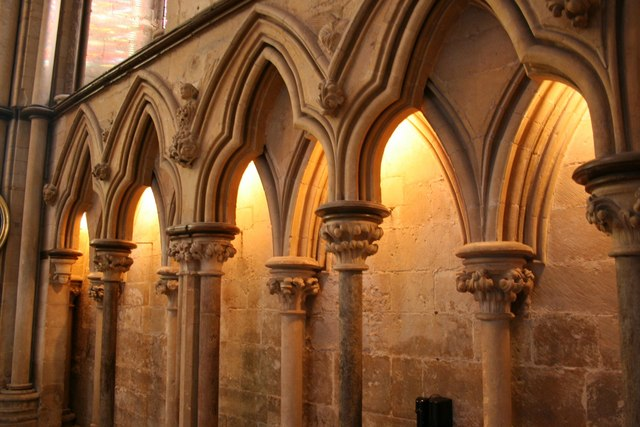
Blind arcades of St. Hugh's choir in Lincoln Cathedral

== Characteristics ==
=== Plans ===
The plans of the early Gothic cathedrals in France were usually in the form of a Greek cross, and were relatively simple. Sens Cathedral, the first in France, was a good example; A facade with three portals and two towers; a long nave with collateral aisles; a rather long choir, a very short transept, and a rounded apse with a double ambulatory and radiating chapels. Variations on this plan were used in most early French cathedrals, including Noyon Cathedral and Notre Dame de Paris.

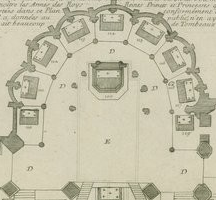
Choir and ambulatory of Saint-Denis abbey church, 1140

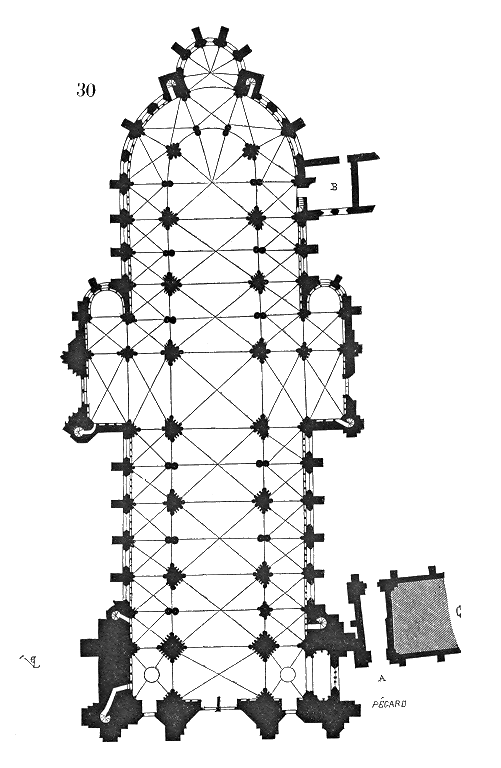
Plan of Sens Cathedral begun in 1135

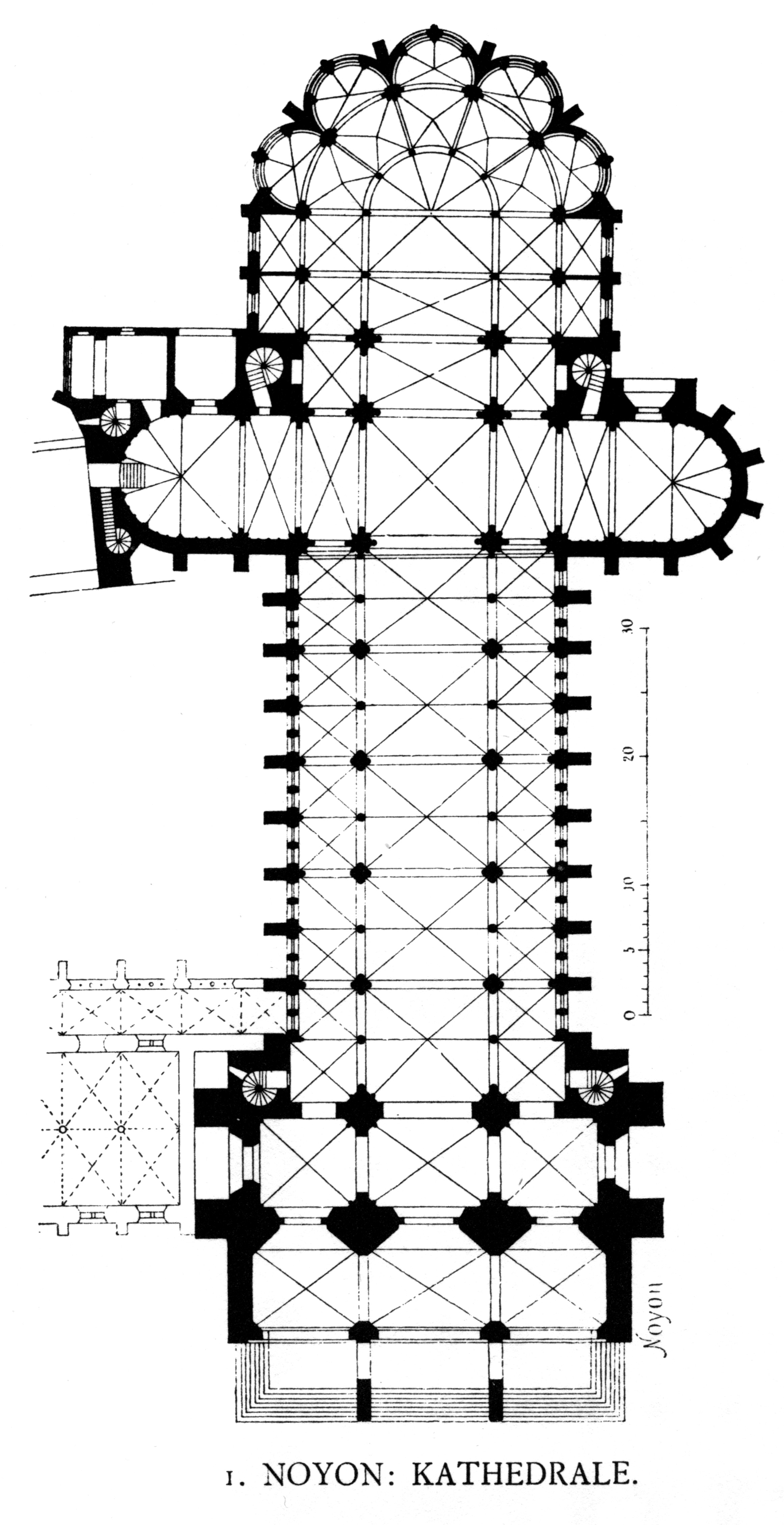
Noyon Cathedral, 1130–1150, plan without later additions

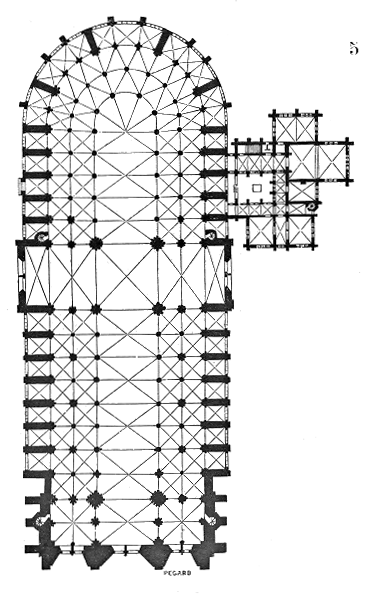
Notre Dame de Paris, begun in 1163, plan with additions since 1220.

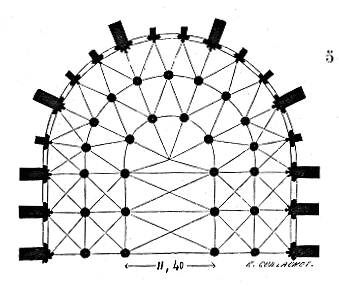
Choir and ambulatory of Notre Dame de Paris before 1220, reconstruction by Violet-le-Duc

The plans of the early English Gothic cathedrals were usually longer and much more complex, with additional transepts, attached chapels, external towers, and usually a rectangular east end (also found in one French cathedral: Laon). The choirs were often as long as the nave. The form expressed the multiple activities often going on simultaneously in the same building.

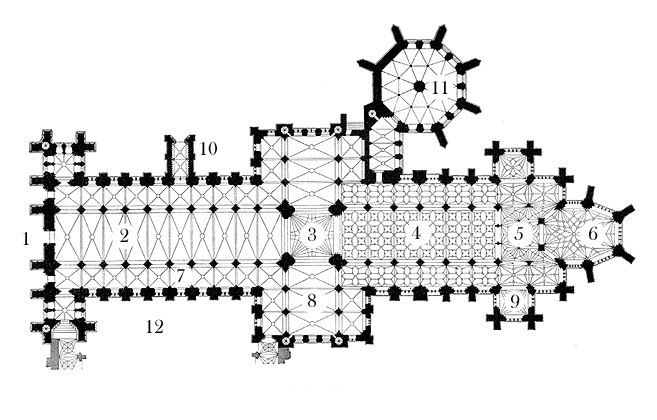
Plan of Wells Cathedral (begun 1175)

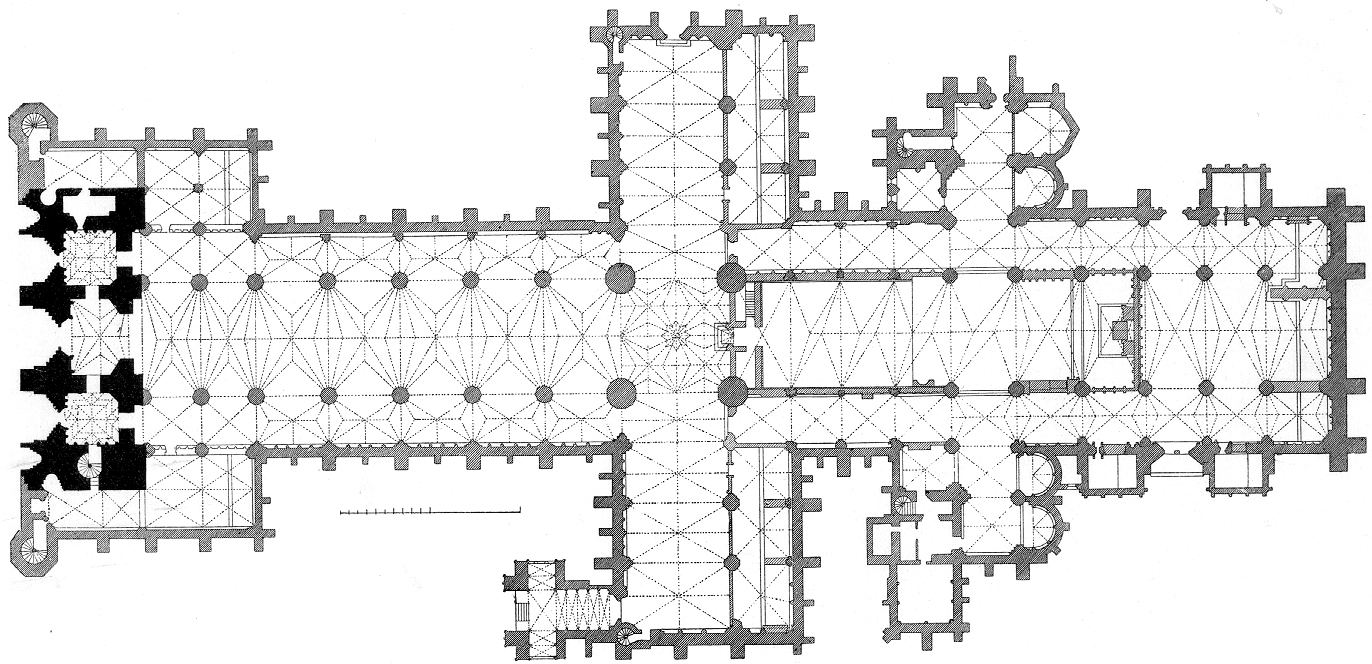
Plan of Lincoln Cathedral (begun 1192)

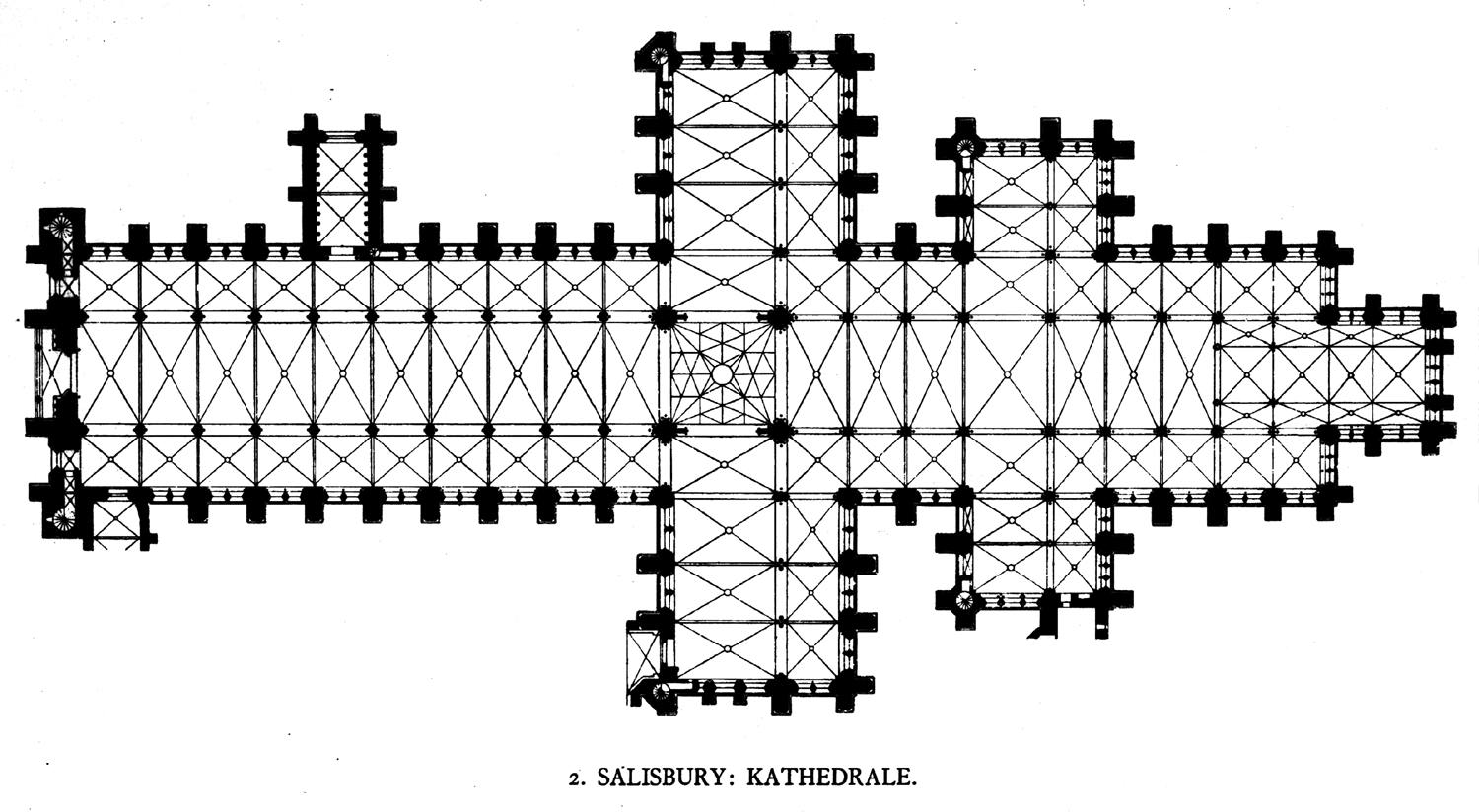
Salisbury Cathedral (begun 1220)

=== Elevations ===
At the time of the early Gothic, the flying buttress was not yet in common use, and buttresses were placed directly close to or directly against the walls. The walls had to be reinforced by additional width. The early Gothic churches in France typically had four elevations or levels in the nave: the aisle arcade on the ground floor; the tribune gallery (a raised passageway) above it; the triforium (a narrower passageway or blind arcade); and the clerestory, with its larger windows, just under the vaults. These multiple levels added to the width and thus the stability of the walls, before the flying buttress was commonly used. This was the system used at Sens Cathedral, Noyon Cathedral and originally at Notre Dame de Paris.

The introduction of a simpler four-part rib vault and especially the flying buttress meant that the walls could be thinner and higher, with more room for windows. By the end of the period, the triforium level was usually eliminated, and larger windows filled the space.

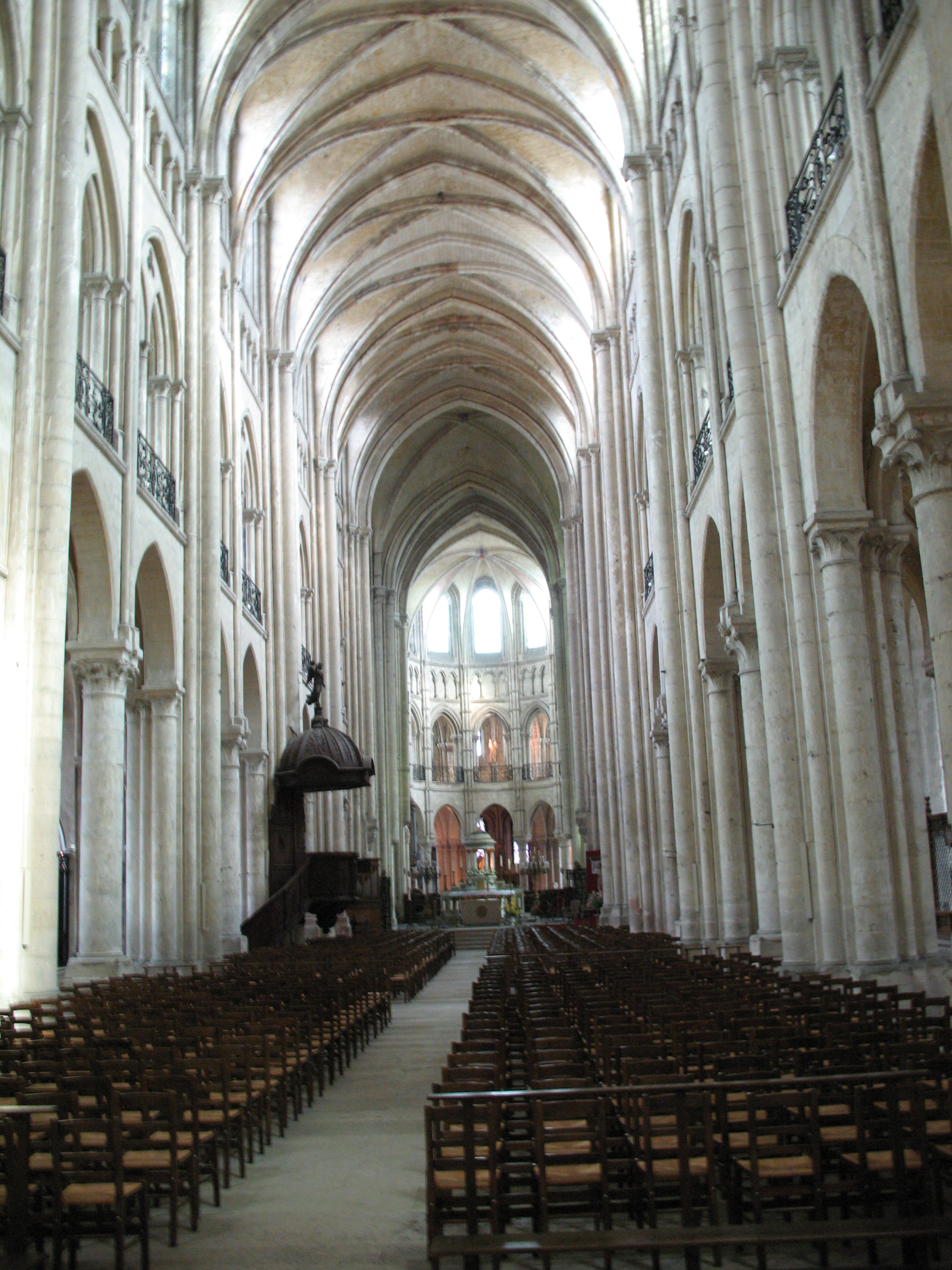
Noyon Cathedral, late 12h century, four levels: arcade, tribune, triforium, clerestory

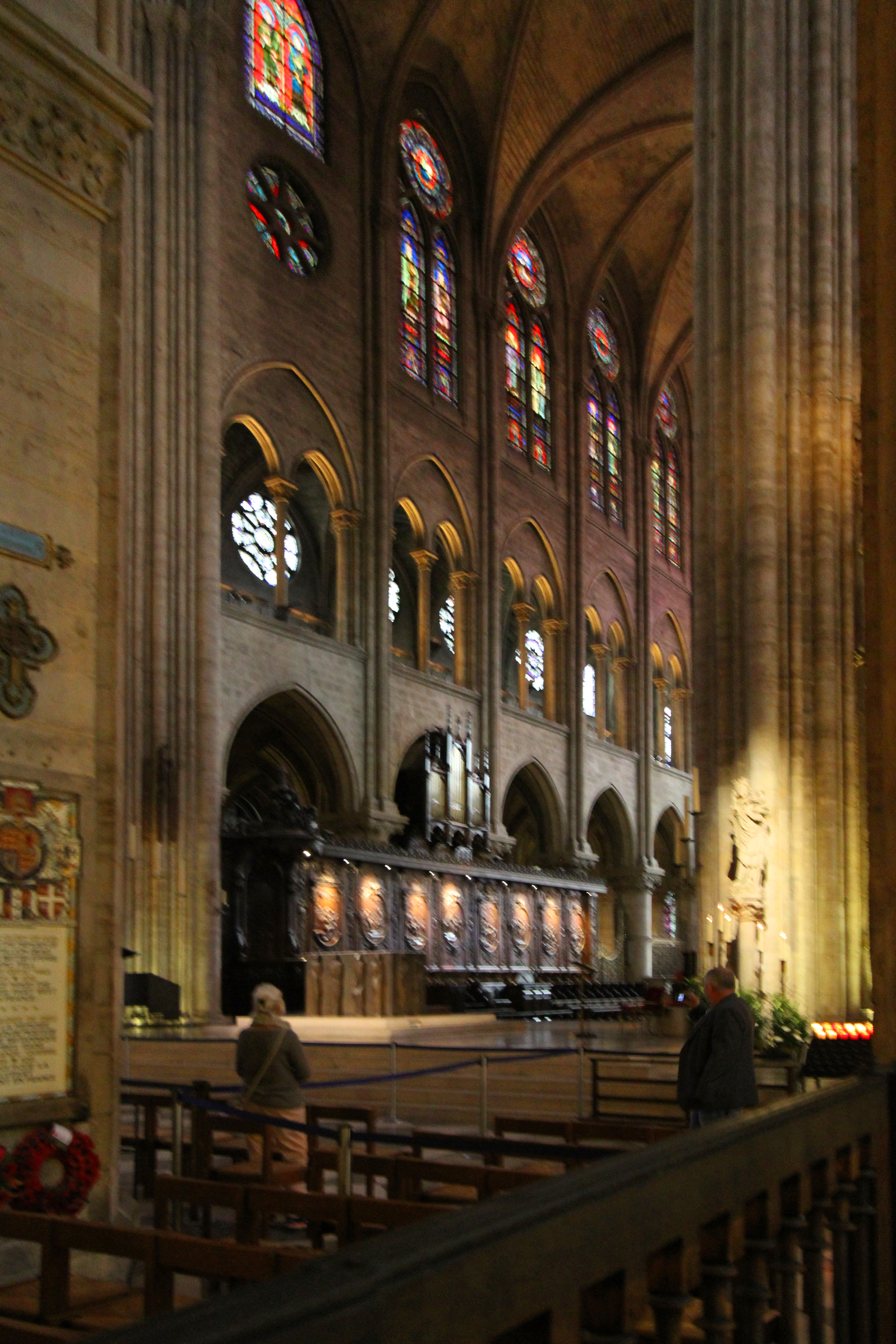
Choir of Notre Dame de Paris, consecration 1182, three levels (arcade, tribune and clerestory); triforia removed by the remodeling of the clerestories after 1220

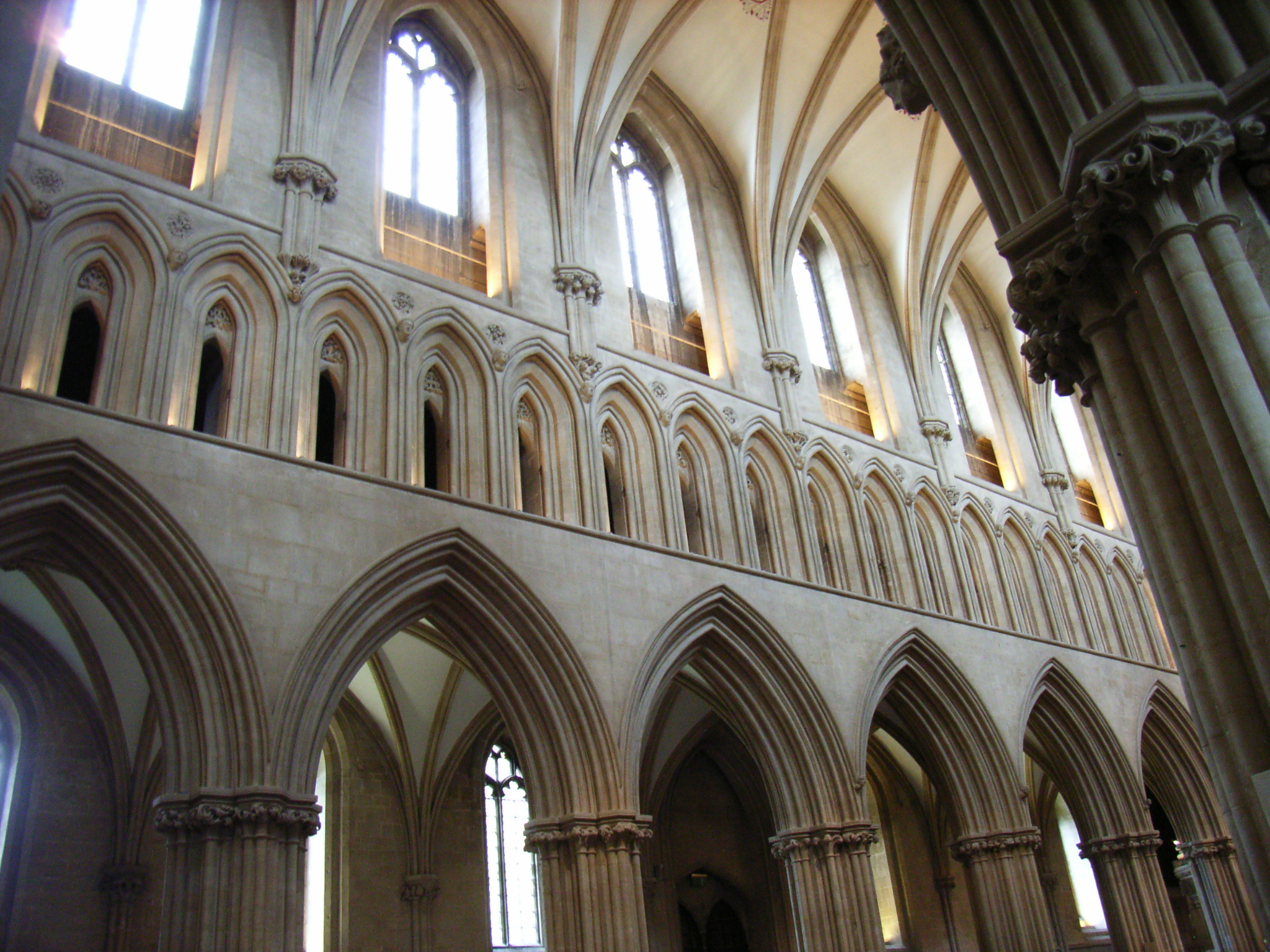
Three-part elevation of Wells Cathedral (begun 1176)

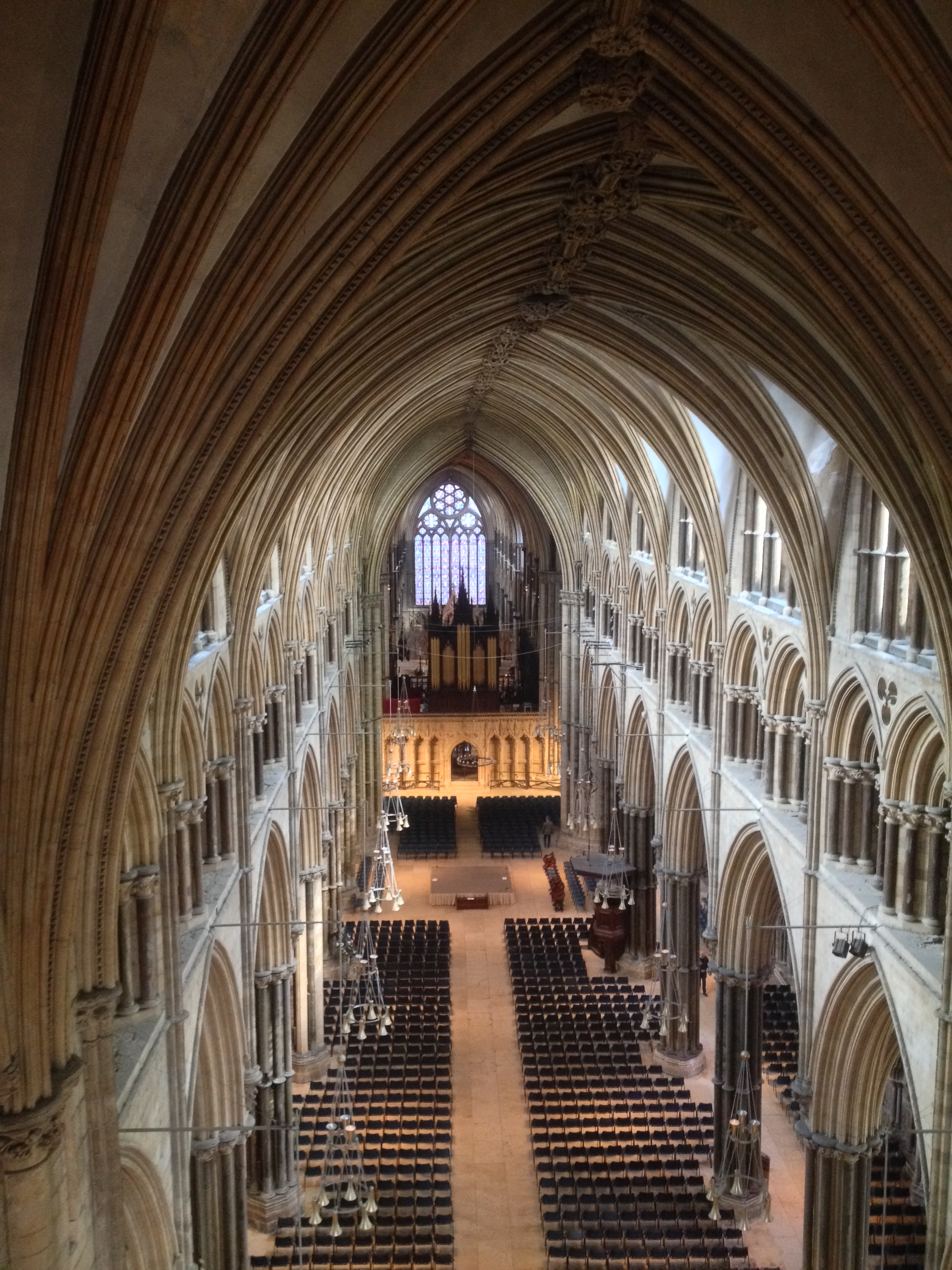
Nave of Lincoln Cathedral. showing three levels; arcades (bottom); tribunes {middle} and clerestory (top).

=== Vaults ===
The rib vault was a characteristic feature of Gothic architecture from the beginning. It was the result of a search for a way to build stone roofs on churches that could not catch fire but would not be too heavy. Variations of rib vaults had been used in Islamic and Romanesque architecture, often to support domes. The rib vault had thin stone ribs which carried the vaulted surface of thin panels. Unlike the earlier barrel vault, where the weight of the vault pressed down directly onto the walls, the arched ribs of a rib vault had a pointed arch, a rib which directed the weight outwards and downwards to specific points, usually piers and columns in the nave below, or outward to the walls, where it was countered by buttresses. The panels between the ribs were made of small pieces of stone, and were much lighter than the earlier barrel vaults. A primitive form, a ribbed groin vault, with round arches, was used at Durham Cathedral, and then, in the course of building, was improved with pointed arches in about 1096. Other variations had been used at Lessay Abbey in Normandy and in Cefalù Cathedral in Sicily at about the same time.

The first Gothic rib vaults were divided by the ribs into six compartments. A six-part vault could cover two sections of the nave. Two pointed arches crossed diagonally and were supported by an intermediate arch, which crossed the nave from side to side. The weight was carried downward by thin columns from the corners of the vault to the alternating heavy piers and thinner columns in the nave below. The weight was distributed unevenly; the piers received the greater weight from diagonal arches, while the columns took the lesser weight from the intermediate arch. This system was used successfully at the Basilica of Saint-Denis, Noyon Cathedral, Laon Cathedral, and Notre-Dame de Paris.

A simpler and stronger vault with just four compartments was developed at the end of the period by eliminating the intermediate arch. As a result, the piers or columns below all received an equal load, and could have the same size and appearance, giving greater harmony to the nave. This system was used increasingly at the end of the Early Gothic period.

More elaborate rib vaults were introduced in England later in the period, at Lincoln Cathedral. These had additional purely decorative ribs called the lierne and the tierceron, in ornate designs like stars and fans, They were the work of Geoffrey de Noiers, a French or French-Normand master-builder who between 1192 and 1200 designed St. Hugh's choir, completed in 1208. The ribs were designed so that the bays slightly offset each other, giving them the nickname of "Crazy vaults". De Noiers was succeeded at Lincoln by Alexander the Mason, who designed the tierceron star vaulting in the cathedral's nave. at Lincoln Cathedral.

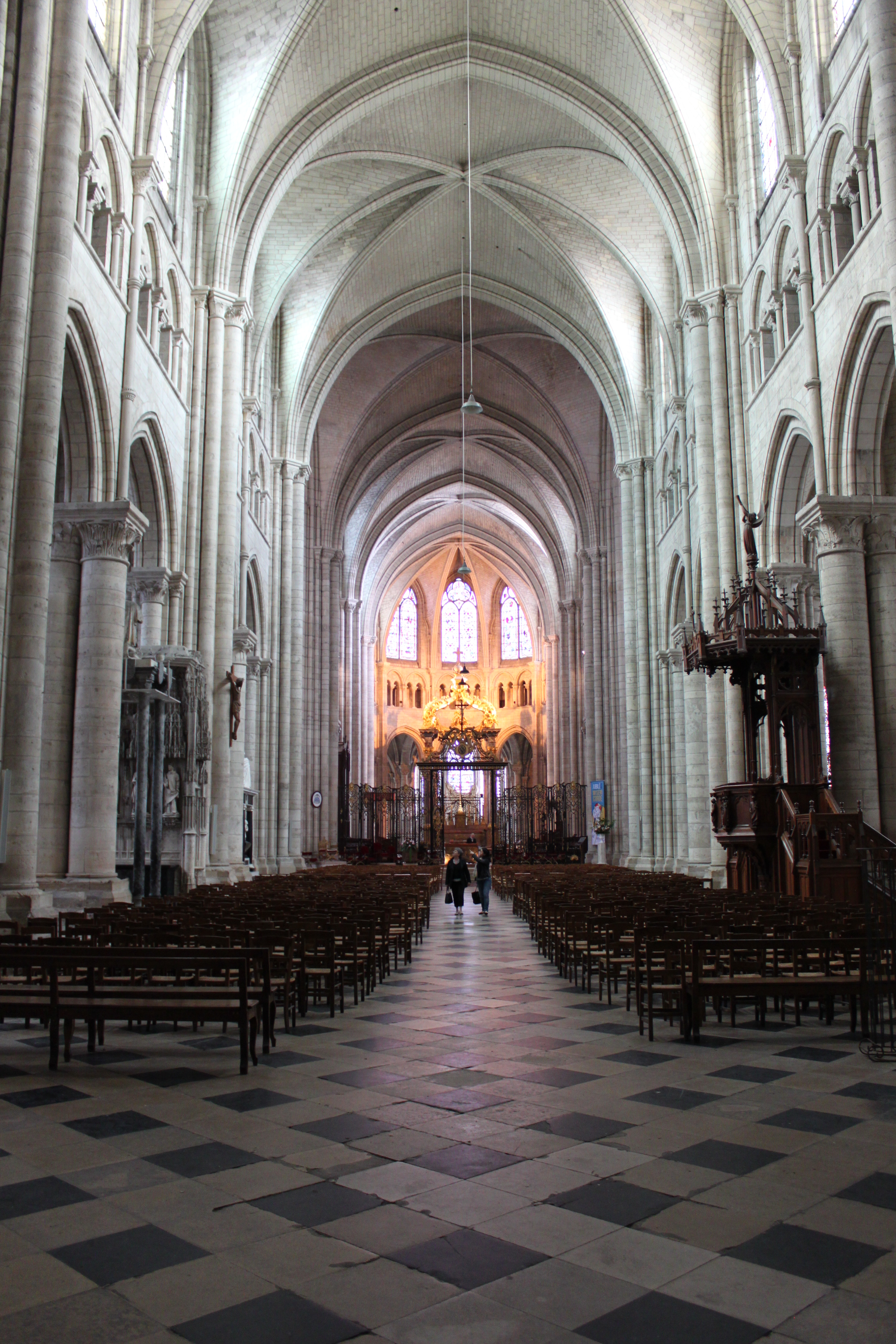
Six-part vaults in Sens Cathedral (begun 1135)

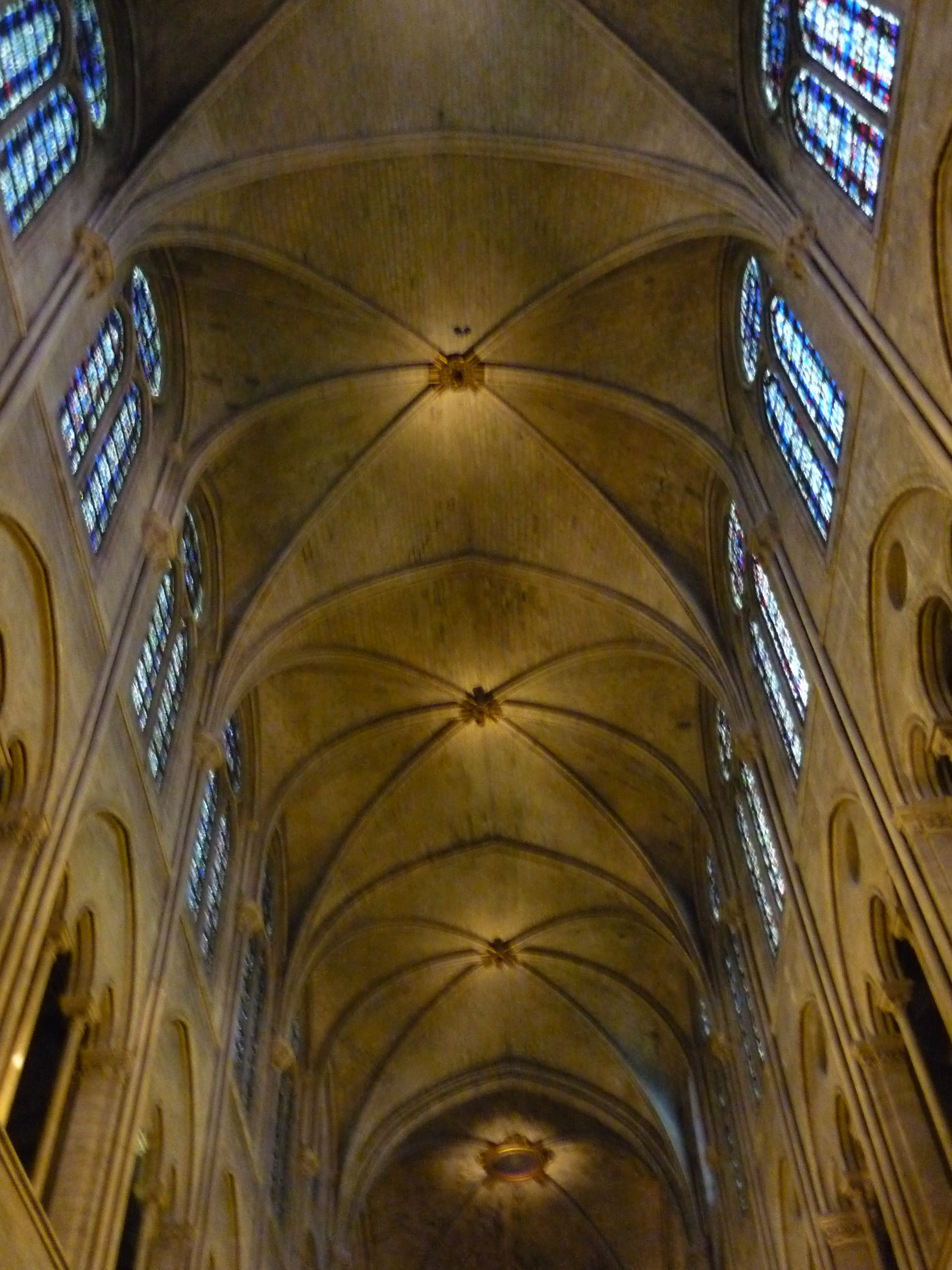
Six-part rib vaults in Notre-Dame de Paris (begun 1163)

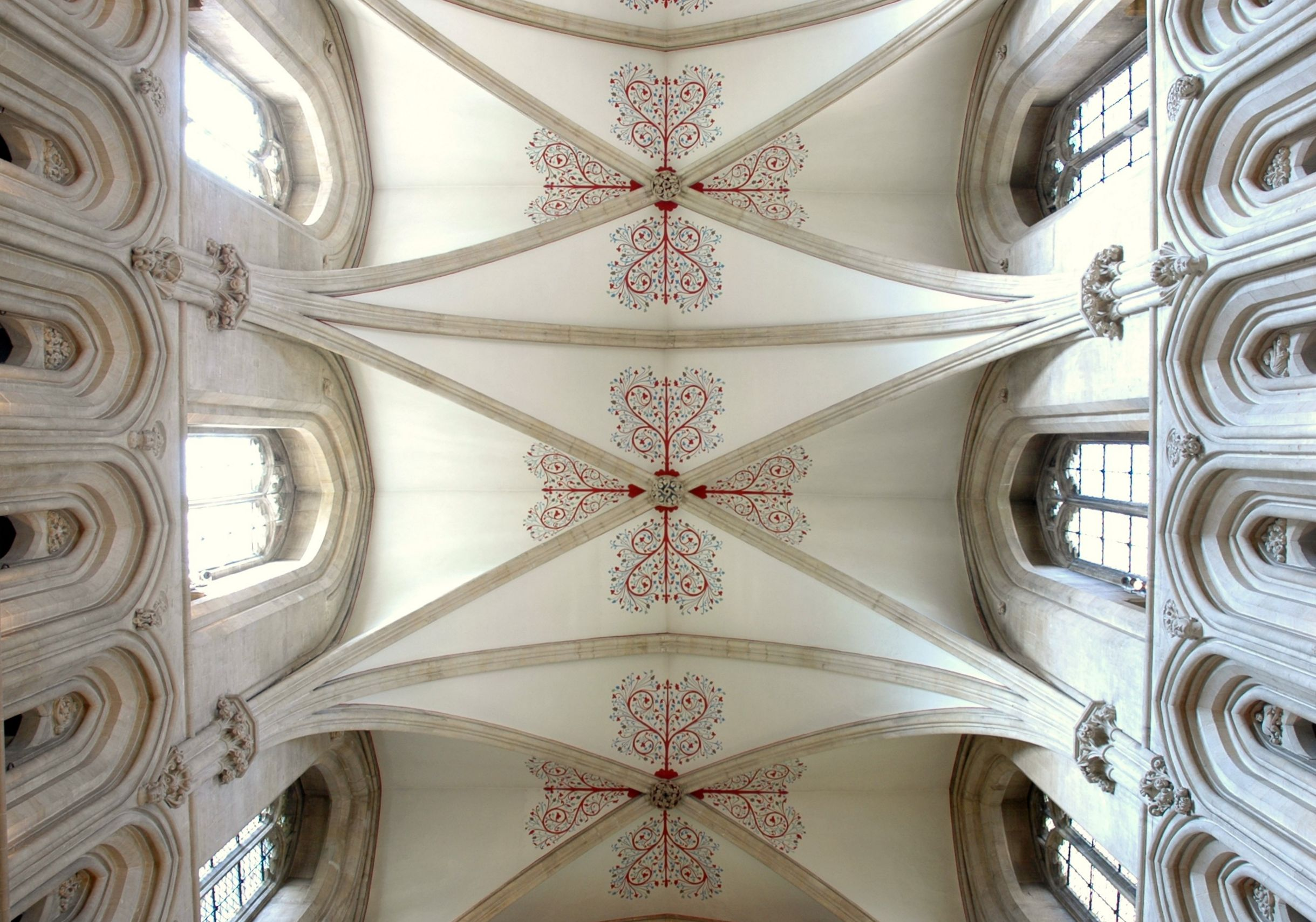
Four-part vaults of Wells Cathedral (begun 1176)

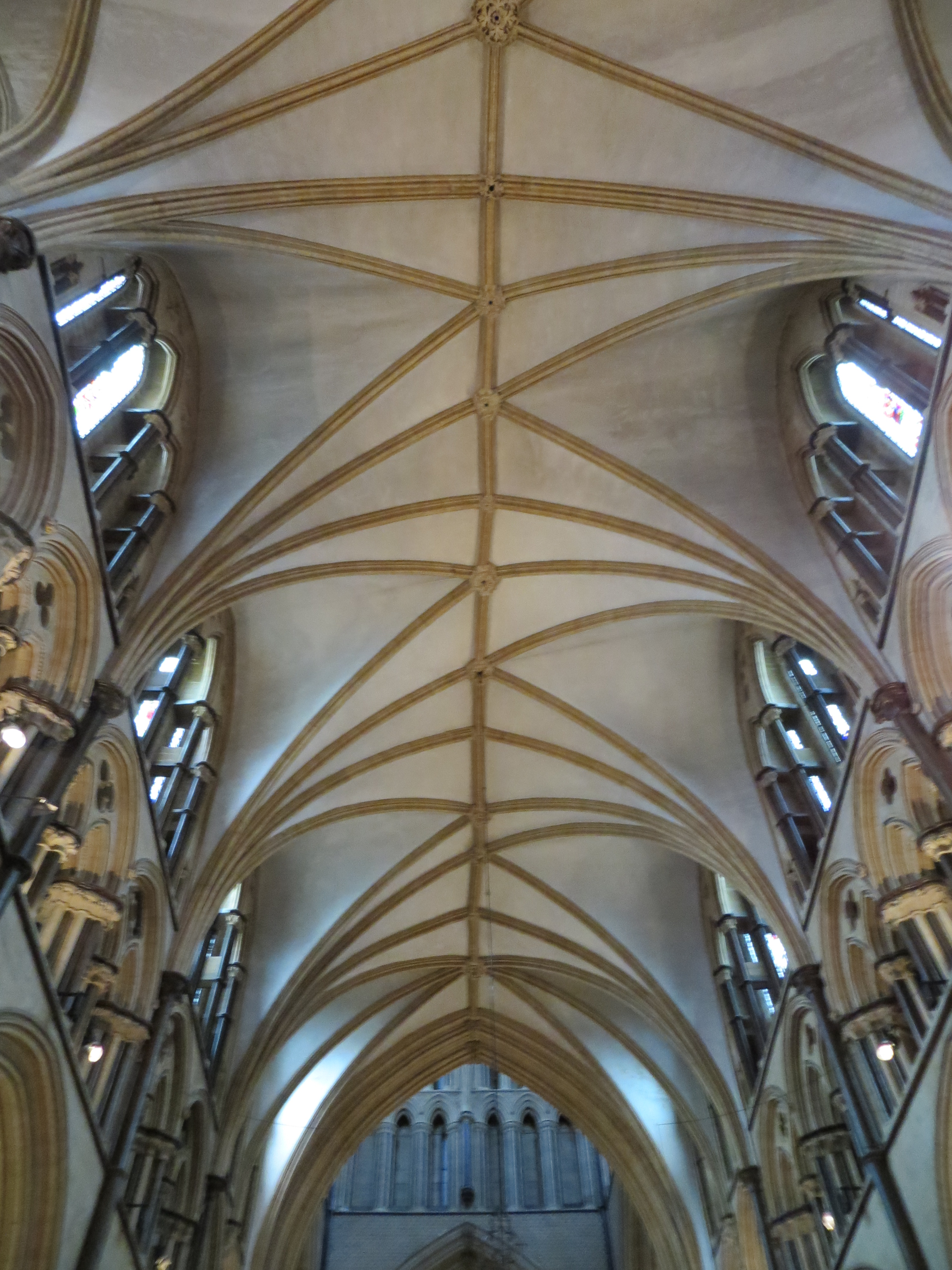
"Crazy vaults" of Lincoln Cathedral in St. Hugh's choir (1192–1208)

=== Flying buttress ===
Variations of the flying buttress existed before the Gothic period, but Gothic architects developed them to a high degree of sophistication. By counterbalancing the thrust against the upper walls from the rib vaults, they made possible the great height, thin walls and large upper windows of the Gothic cathedrals. The early Gothic buttresses were placed close to the walls, and were columns of stone with a short arch to the upper level, between the windows. They were often topped by stone pinnacles both for decoration, and to make them even heavier.

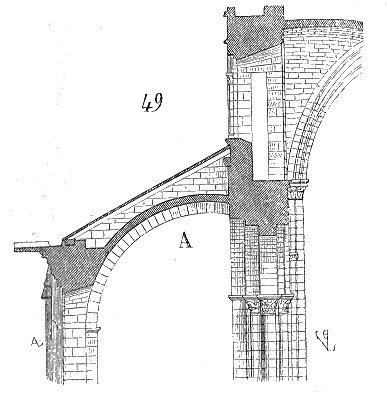
Flying buttress at the Abbey of Saint-Étienne, Caen, Caen (11th century)

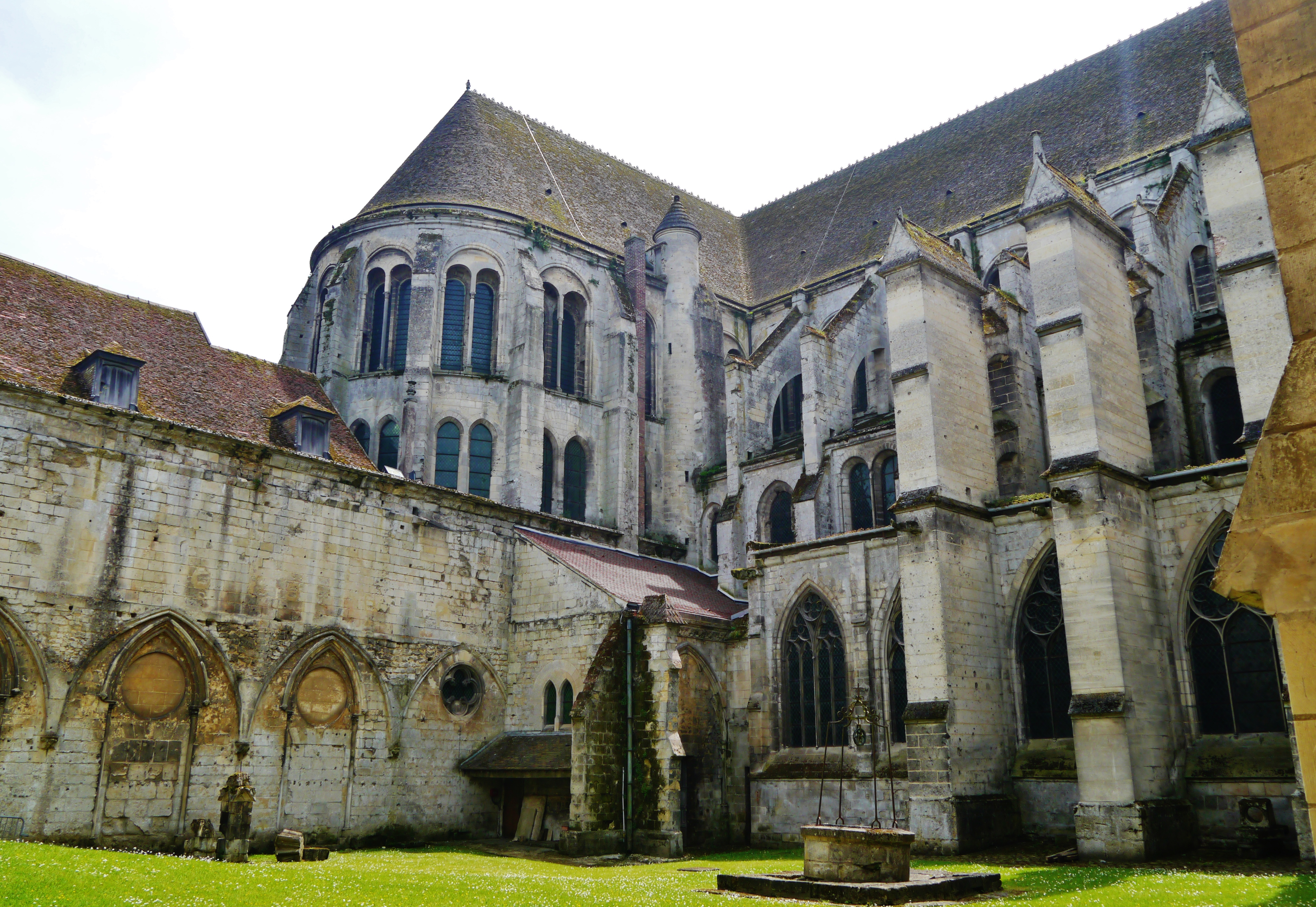
Early buttresses of Noyon Cathedral

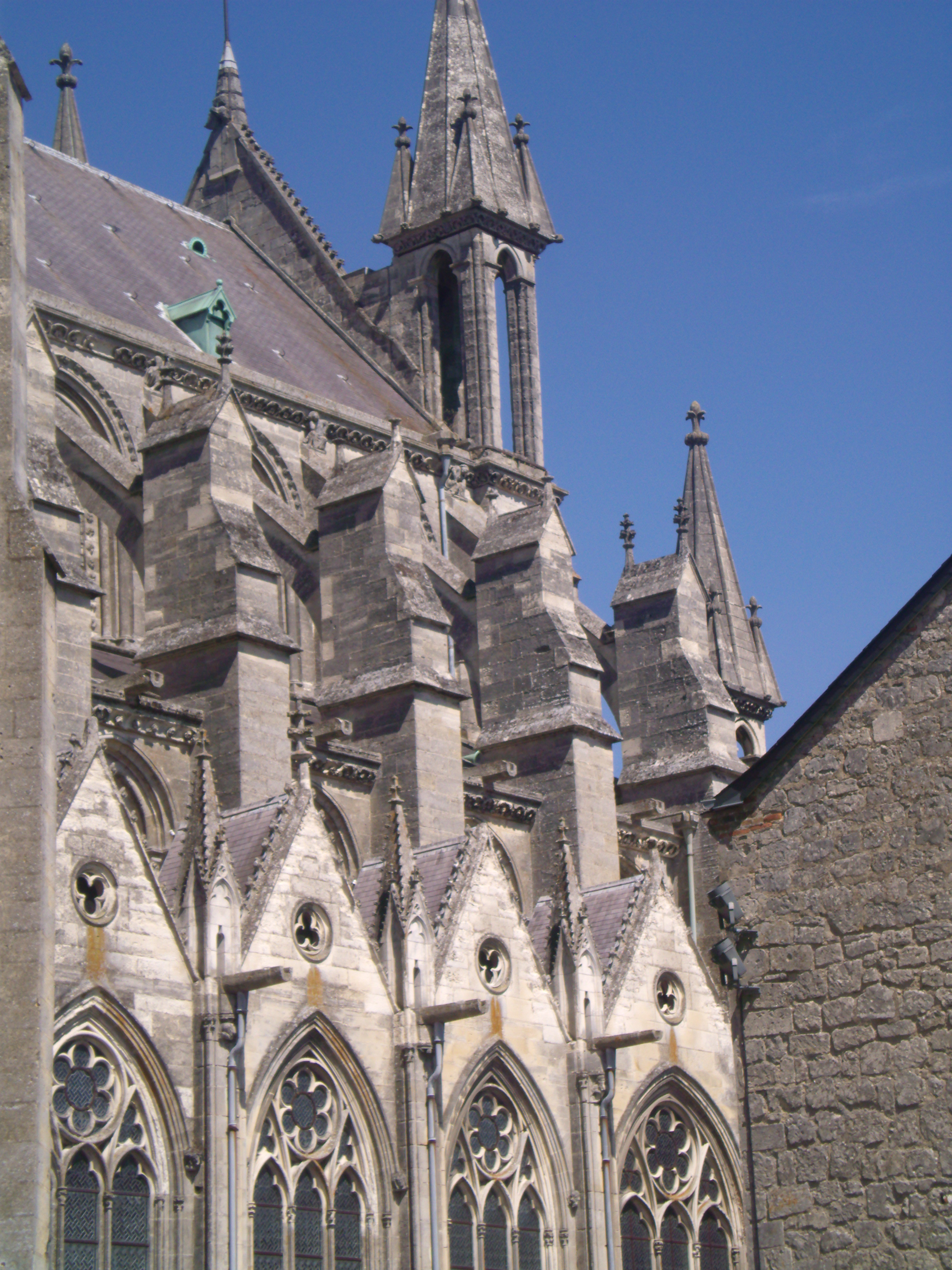
Buttresses of Laon Cathedral

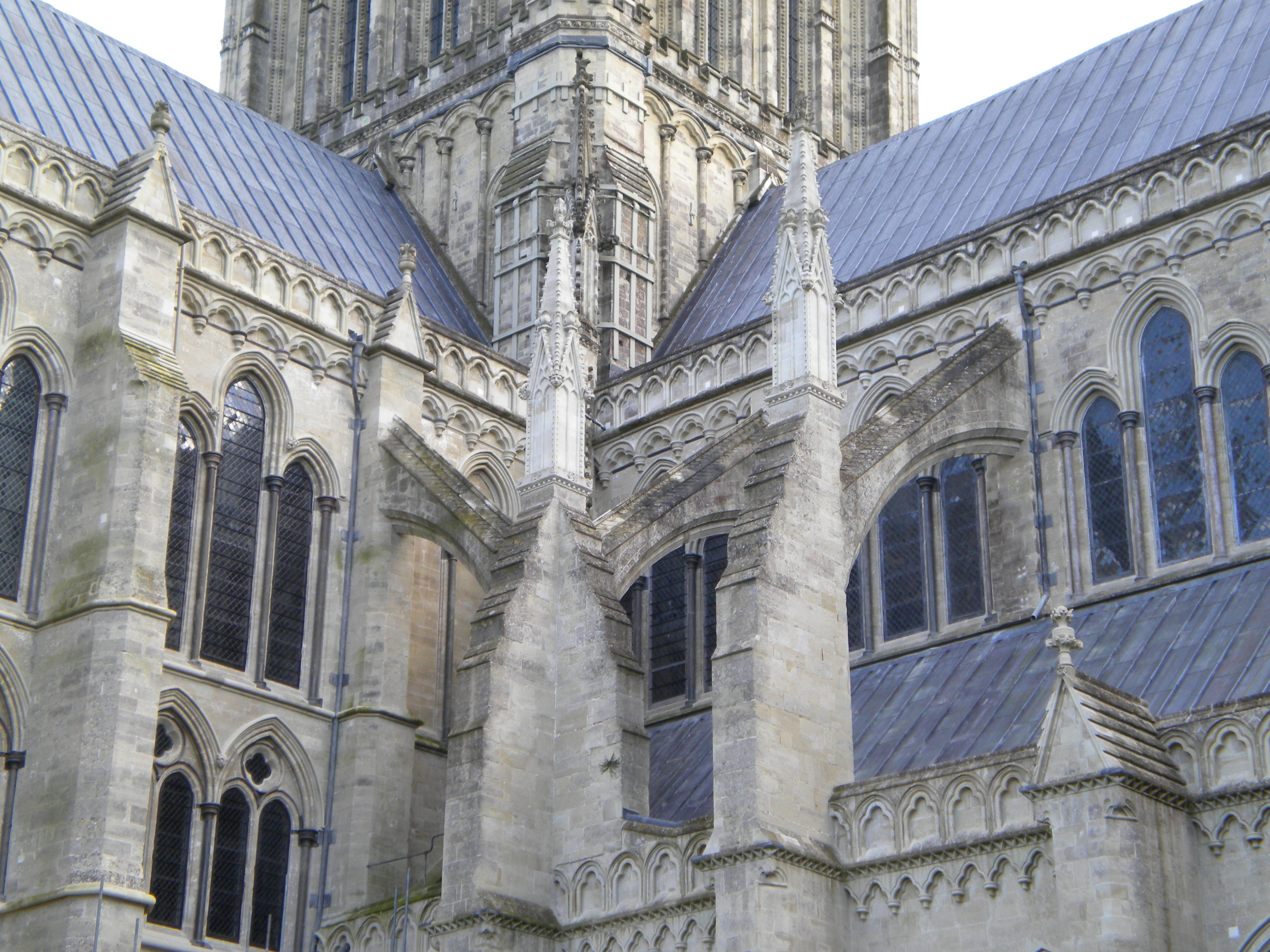
Flying buttresses of Salisbury Cathedral

=== Sculpture ===
The most important sculptural decoration of early Gothic cathedrals was found over and around the portals, or doorways, on the tympanum and sometimes also on the columns. Following the model of Romanesque churches, these depicted the Holy Family and Saints. Following the tradition of Romanesque sculpture, the figures were usually stiff, straight, simple forms, and often elongated. As the period advanced, the sculpture became more naturalistic. The floral and vegetal sculpture of the capitals of columns in the nave was more realistic, showing a close observation of nature.

One of the finest examples of early Gothic sculpture is the tympanum over the royal portal of Chartres Cathedral (1145–1245), which survived a fire that destroyed much of the early Cathedral.

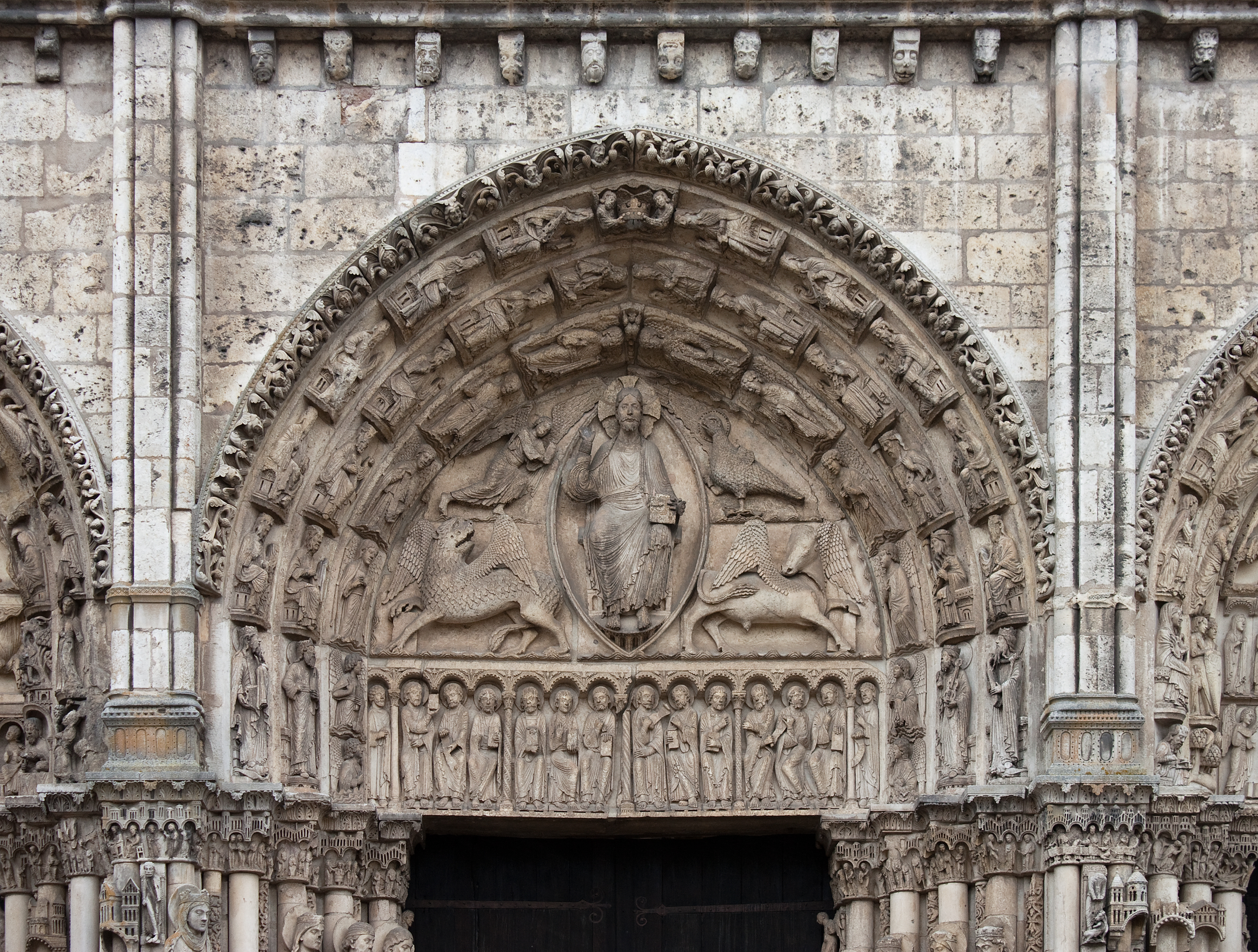
Central tympanum of the royal portal, Chartres Cathedral (1145–1245)

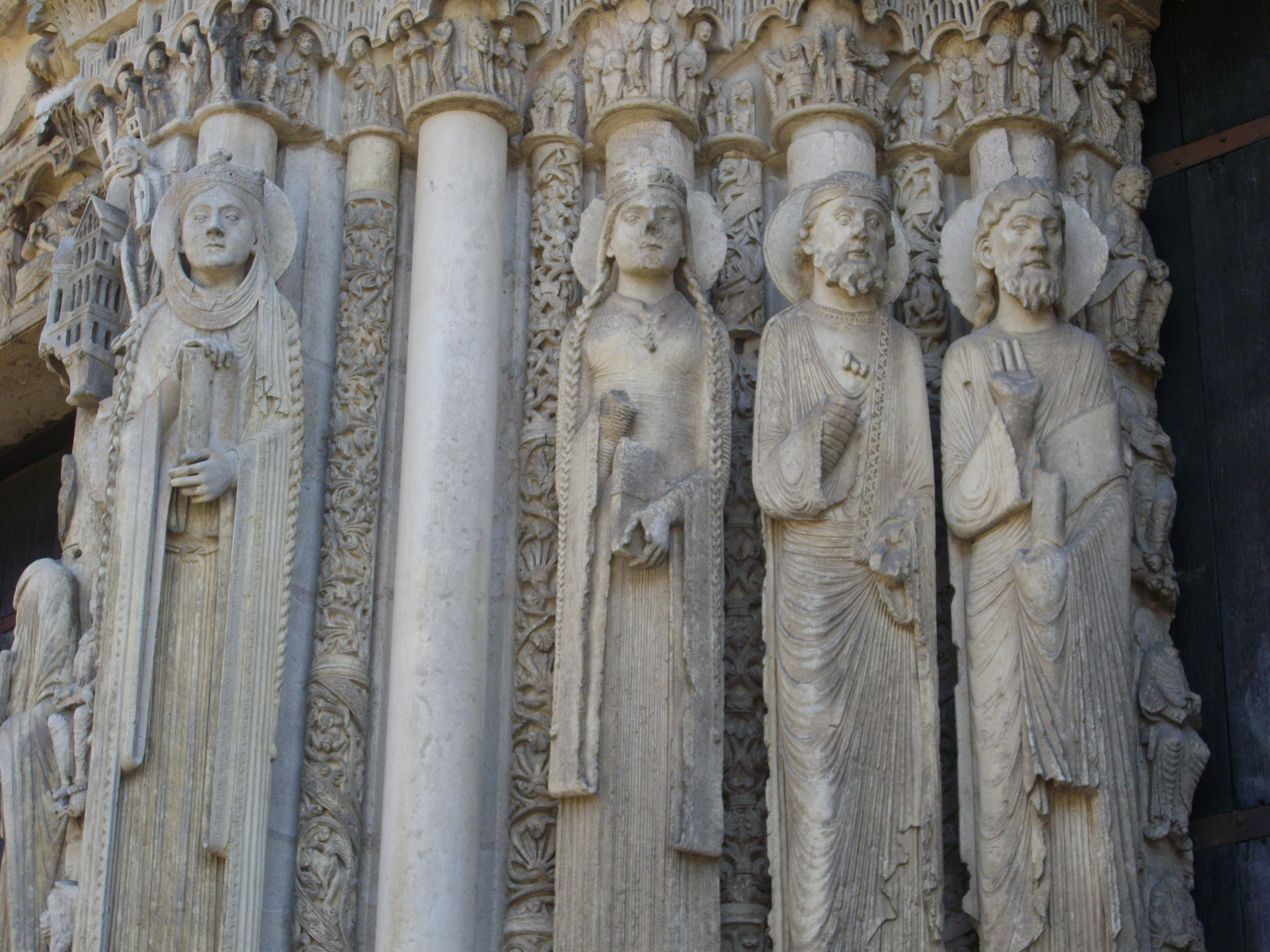
Detail of the royal portal of Chartres Cathedral (1145–1245)

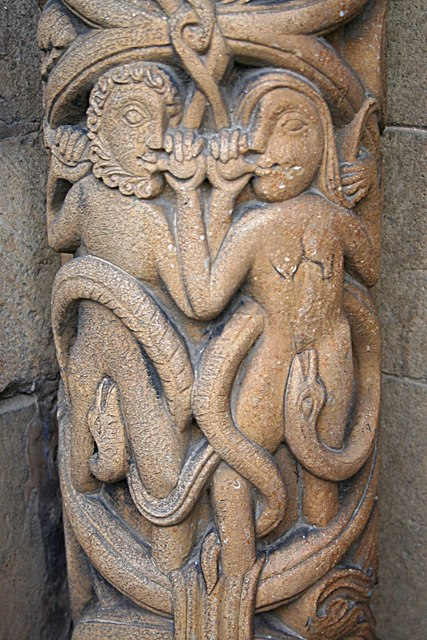
Adam and Eve eating apples, west front of Lincoln Cathedral (12th century)
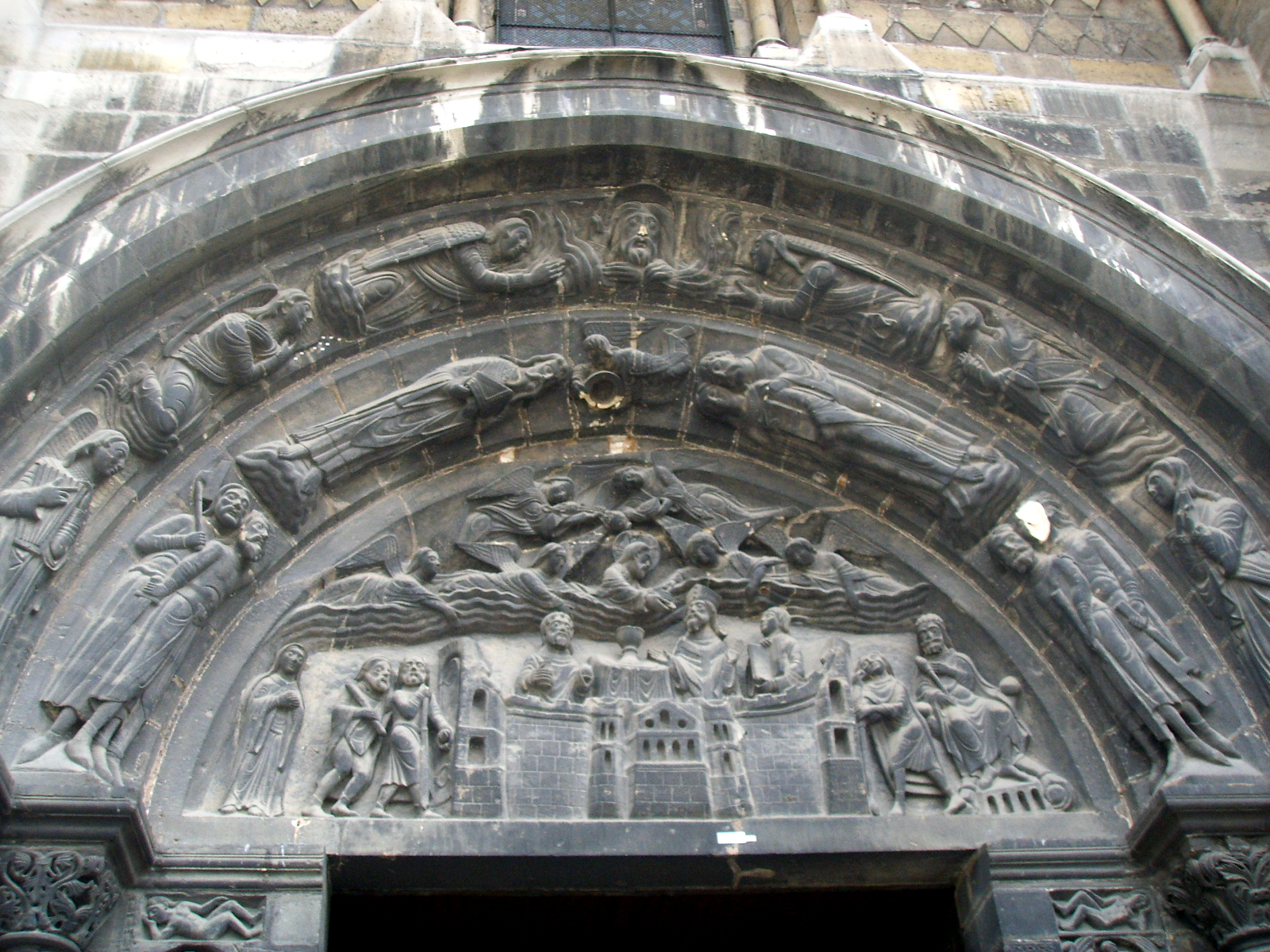
Sculpture of the portal of Basilica of Saint Denis

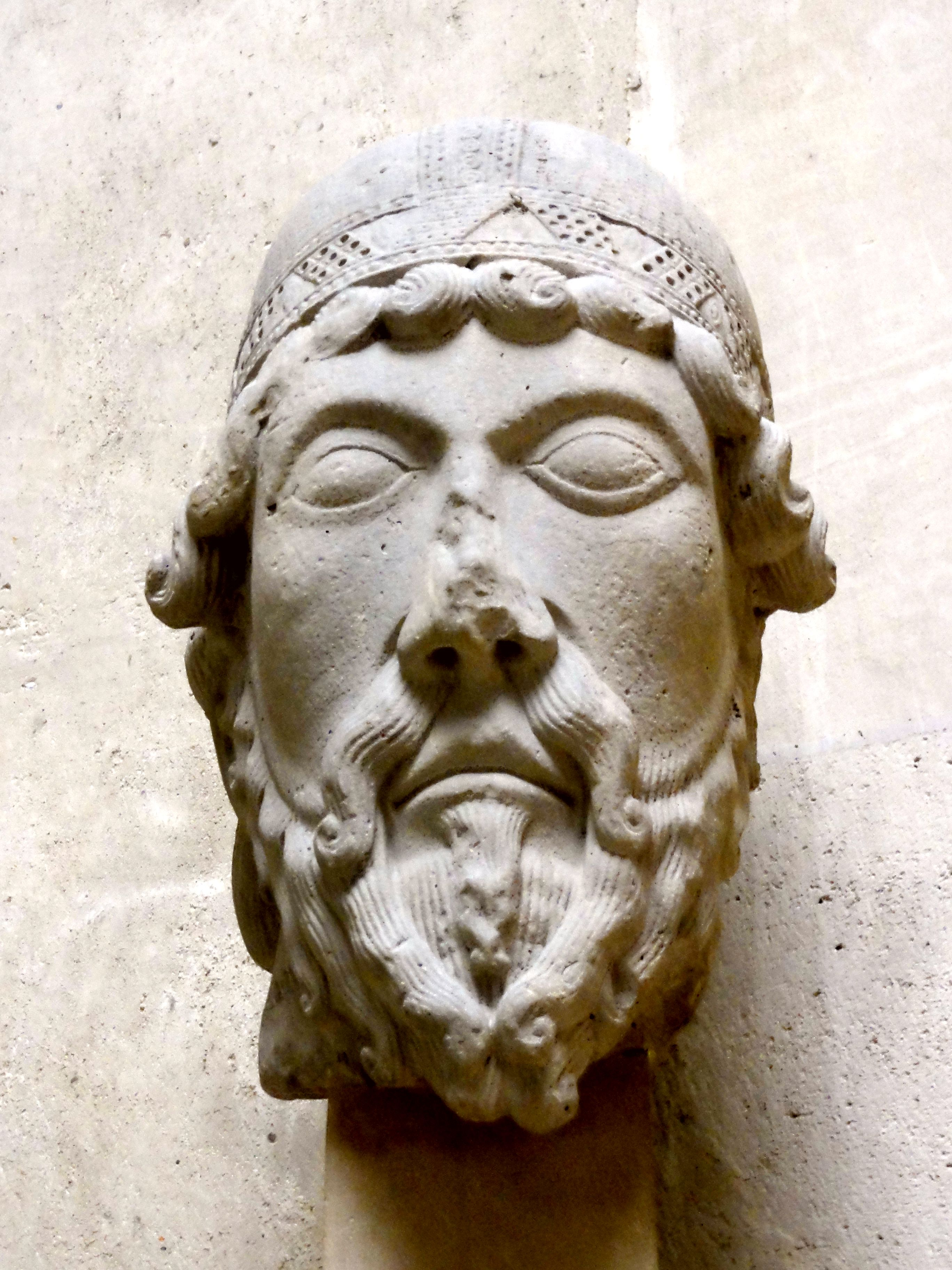
Early Gothic style: Prophet's head, 1137-1140, originally in the Basilica of St. Denis

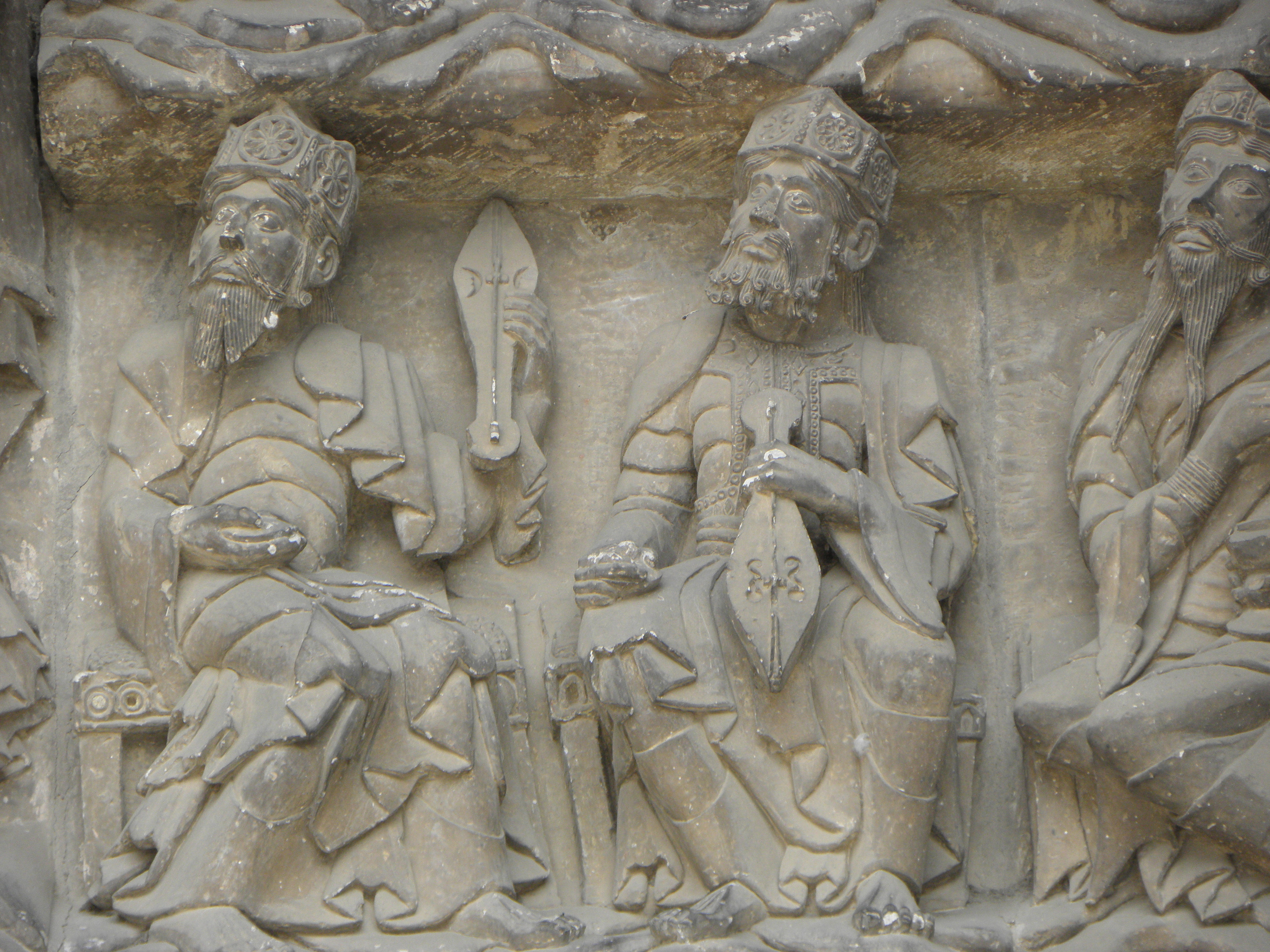
Image of Biblical Wise Men, Moissac Abbey (12th. c.)

Sculpture was lavishly used in Early Gothic cathedrals, particularly over the portals. The early Gothic sculpture was stiff and formal and lacked realism, unlike the sculpture the later sculpture of Rayonnant cathedrals, which was influenced by the ancient Roman sculpture which had recently been discovered.

=

== Early Gothic Stained Glass ==
(See also French Gothic stained glass windows) and English Gothic stained glass windows)

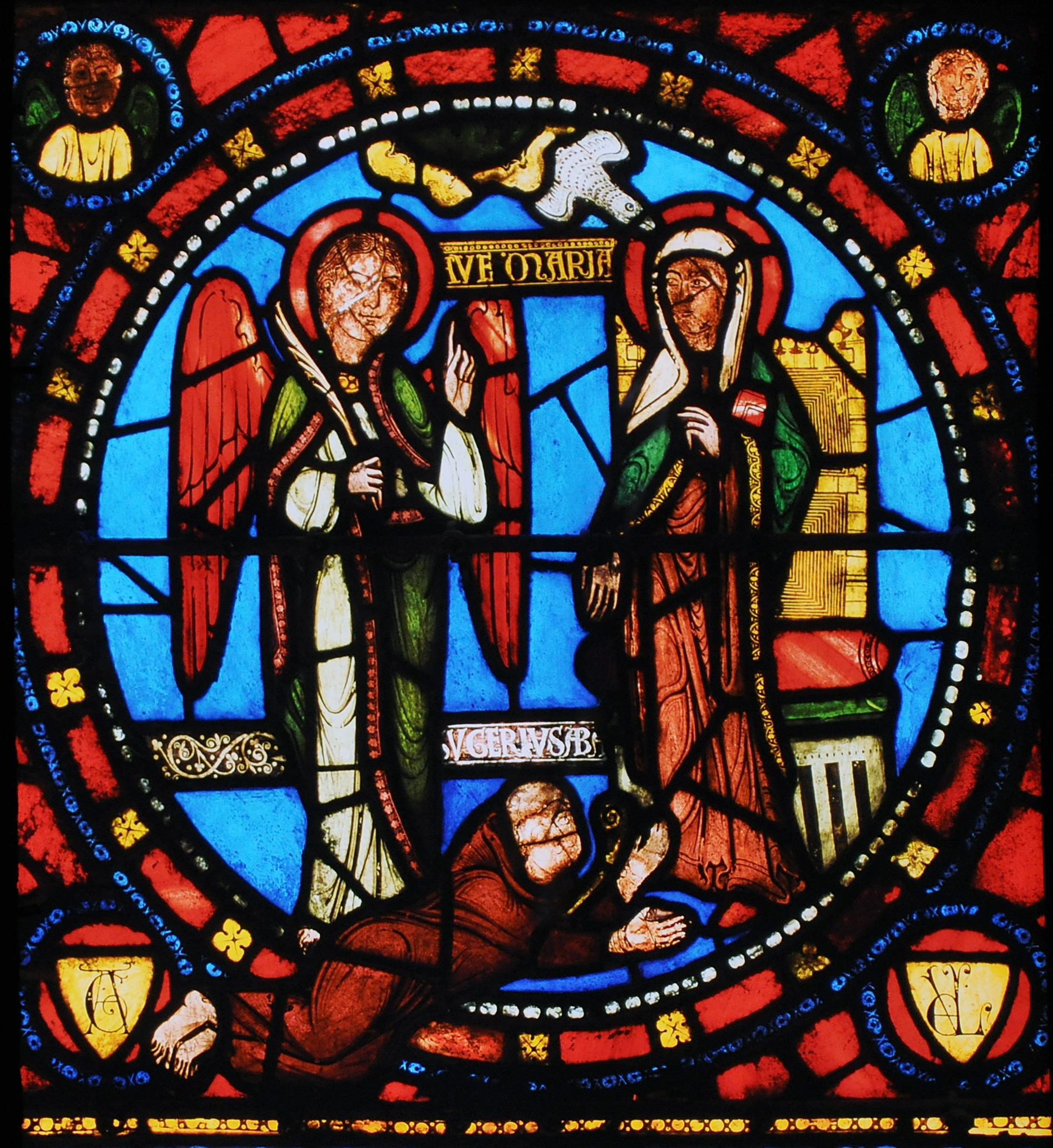
Basilica of Saint-Denis, Apse, axial chapel, The Annonciation, with Abbot Suger, the patron, depicted at the feet of the Virgin. (1140–1144)

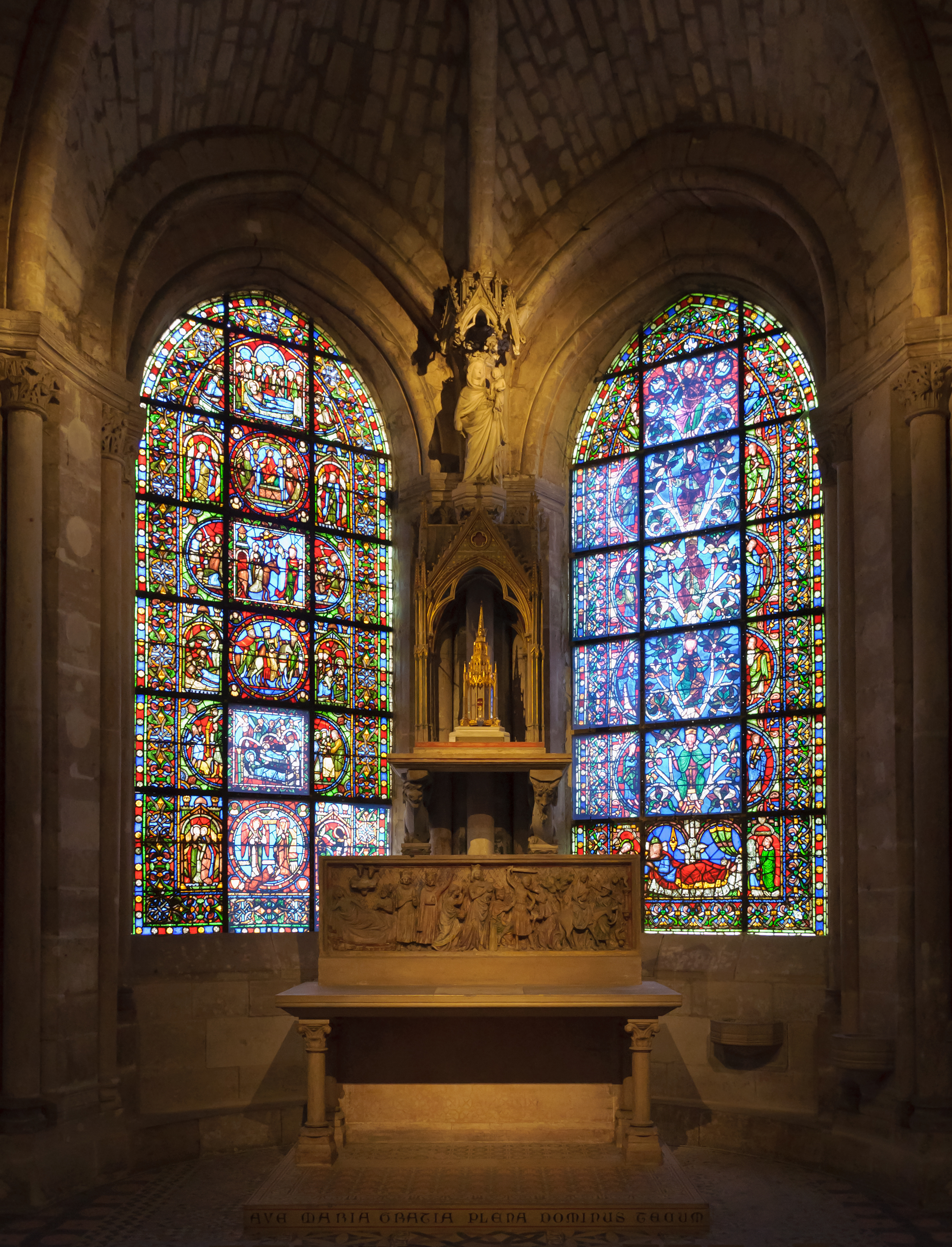
Windows of the Chapel of the Virgin at the Basilica of Saint-Denis. The Tree of Jesse window is on the right

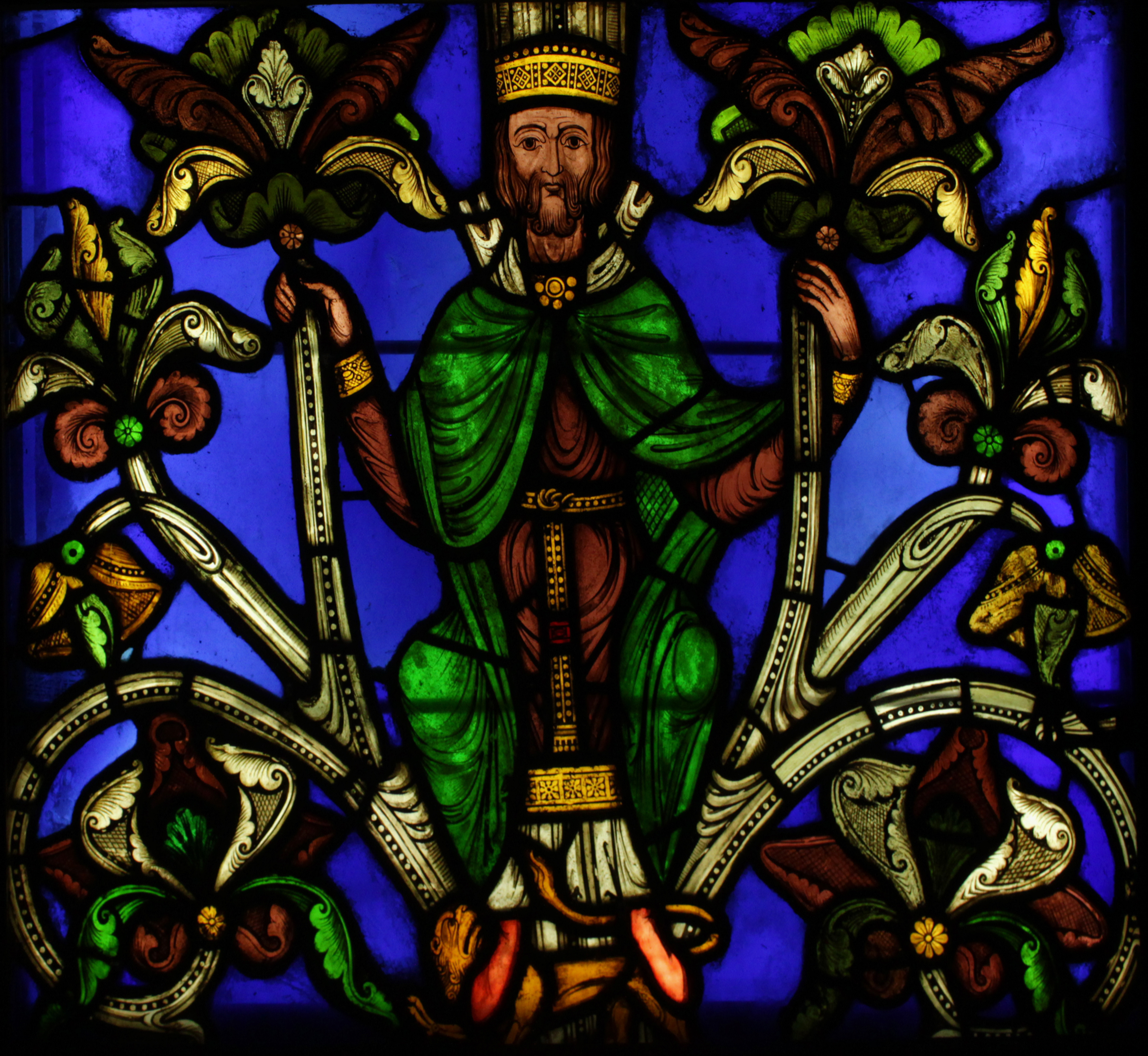
Detail of the Tree of Jesse window, Basilica of Saint-Denis (1140–44)

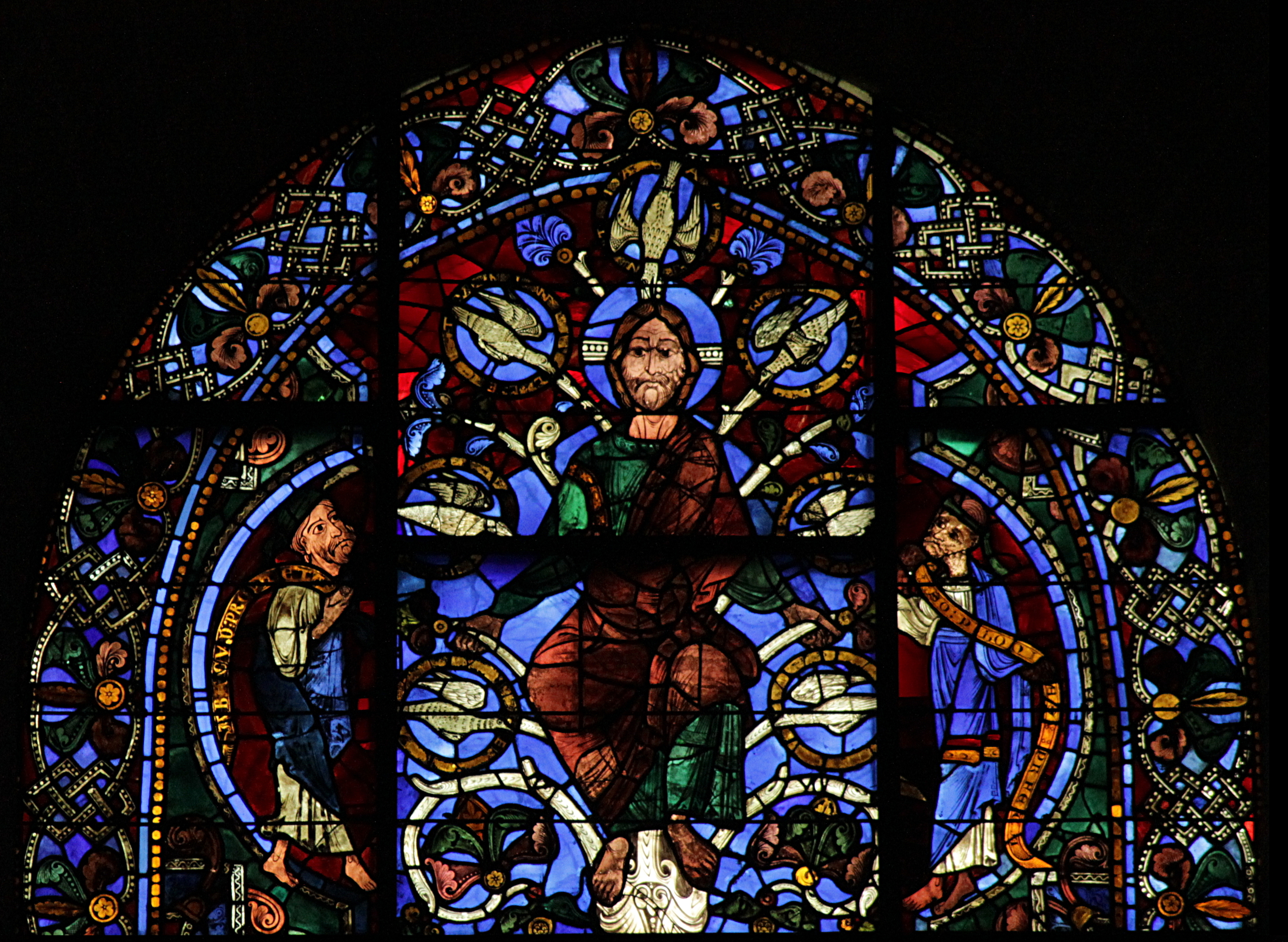
Top of the Tree of Jessé Window, Chartres Cathedral (1150)

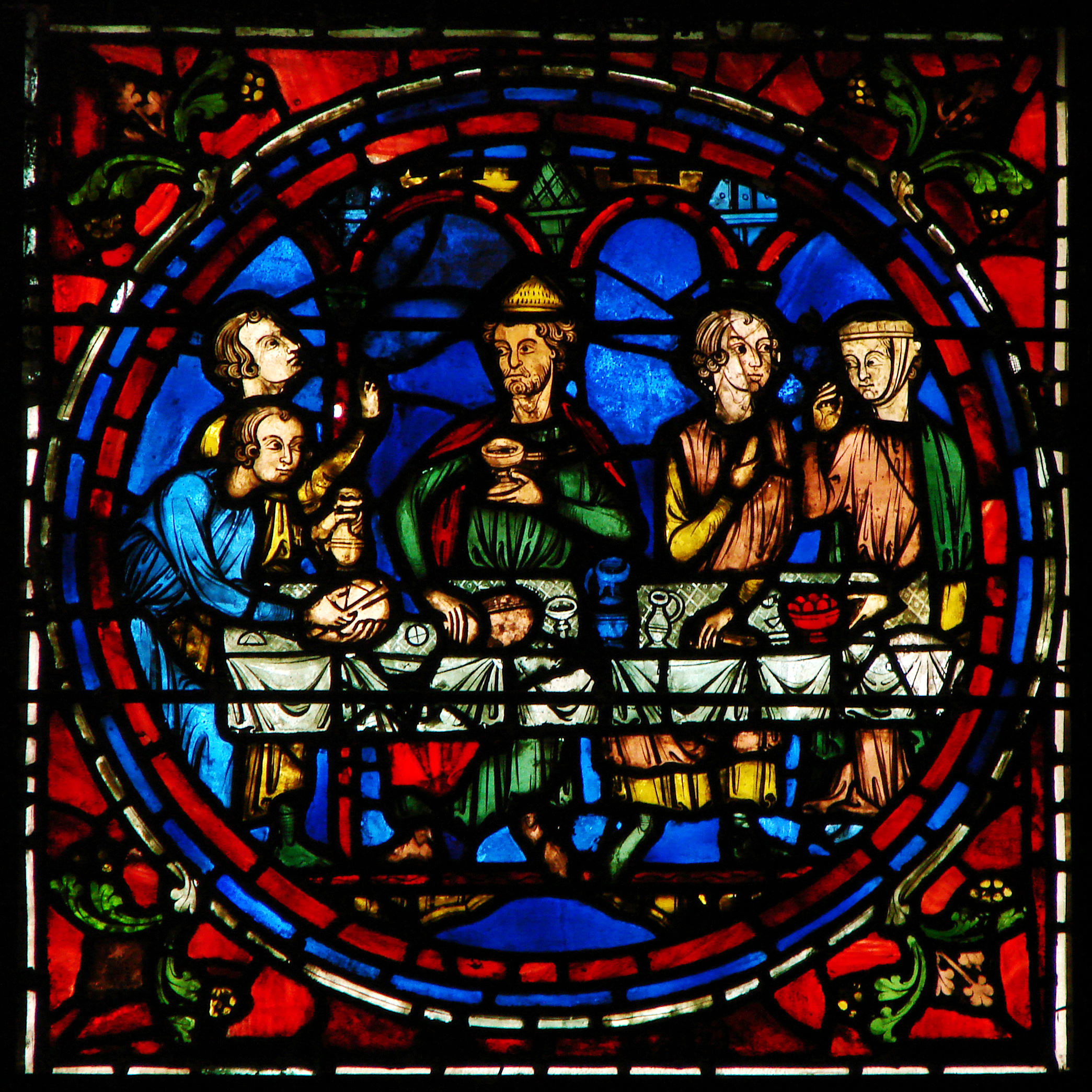
Detail of the stained glass window called Notre-Dame de la Belle Verierre

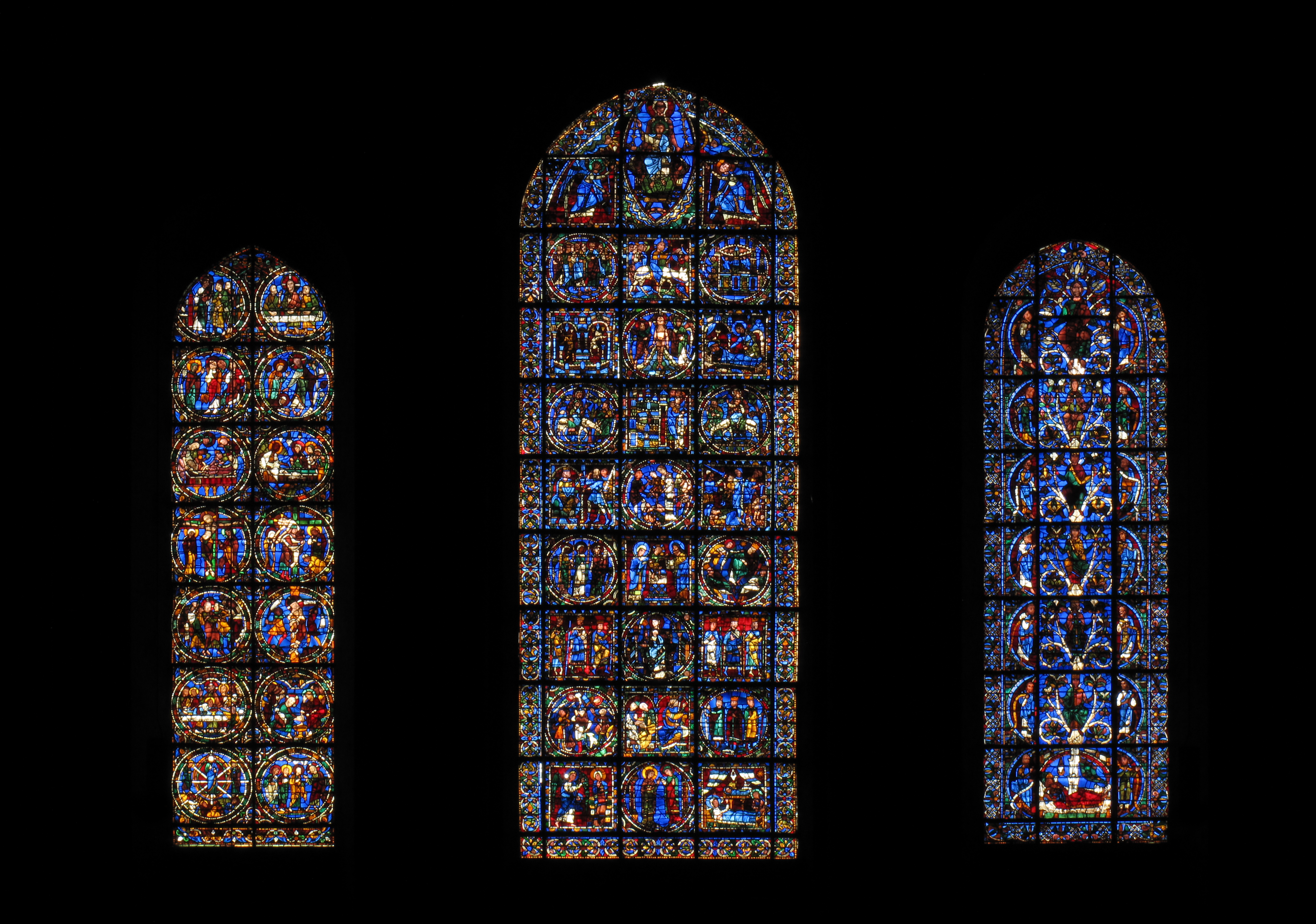
Chartres Cathedral, Passion of Christ windows, (c. 1150)

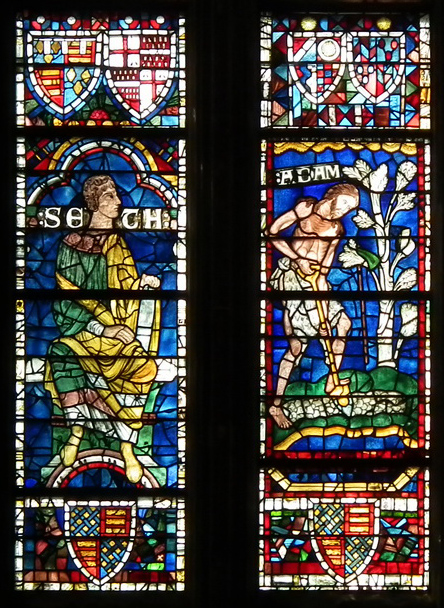
Seth and Adam Window, from Canterbury Cathedral (late 12th – early 13th c.)

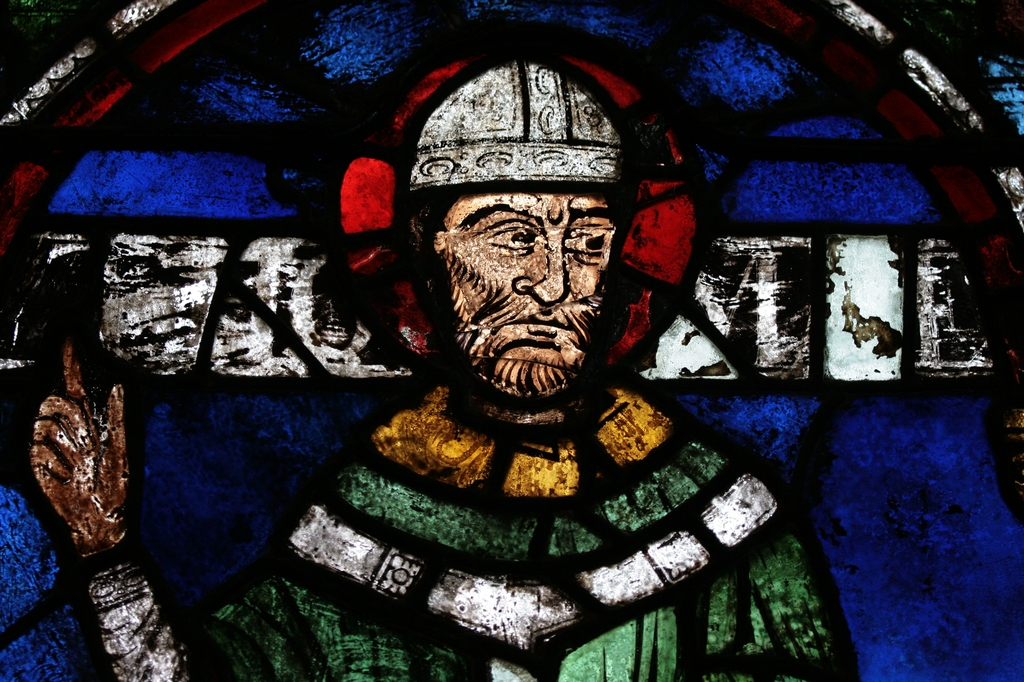
Face from the Thomas Becket window at Canterbury Cathedral (late 12th – early 13th c.)

Stained glass had existed for centuries, and was used in Romanesque churches, but it became was a particularly important feature of early Gothic architecture. The Abbot Suger commissioned stained glass windows for the Basilica of Saint-Denis to fill the ambulatory and chapels with what he considered to be divine light. The stained glass windows of Saint-Denis and other Early Gothic churches had a particular intensity of color, partly because the glass was thicker and used more color, and partly because the early windows were small, and their light had a more striking contrast with the dark interiors of the churches and cathedrals.

The process of making the windows was described by the monk Theophilus Presbyter in the early 12th century. The glass and the windows were made by different craftsmen, usually at different locations. The molten glass was coloured with metal oxides; cobalt for blue, copper for red, iron for green, manganese for purple and antimony for yellow. When molten, it was blown into a bubble, formed into a tubular shape, cut at the ends to make a cylinder, then slit and flattened while it was still hot. It ranged in thickness from 3 to 8 mm (0.12 to 0.31 in). A full-size drawing of the window was made on a large table, and then pieces of colored glass were "grozed", or cracked off the sheet, and assembled on the table. The details of the windows were then painted on in vitreous enamel, then fired. The glass pieces were fit into grooved pieces of lead, which were soldered together, and sealed with putty to make them waterproof, to complete the window.

The rose window was a particular feature of early Gothic. They had been used in Romanesque architecture, such as the two small windows on the facade of Pomposa Abbey in Italy (early 10th century), but they became more important and complex in the Gothic period. In the 12th century, according to Bernard of Clairvaux, writing at that time, the rose was the symbol of the Virgin Mary, and had a prominent place on the facades of the cathedrals named for her, such as Notre-Dame de Paris, whose west rose window dates from 1220.

The rose windows of the Early Gothic churches were composed of plate tracery, a geometric pattern of openings in stone over the central portal. Early examples included the rose on the west facade of the Basilica of Saint-Denis (though the present window is not original), and the early rose window on the west front of Chartres Cathedral. Other examples are the rose on the west front of Laon Cathedral and Notre Dame de Mantes (1210) York Minster has what is believed to be the oldest existing stained glass window in England, a Tree of Jesse (1170).

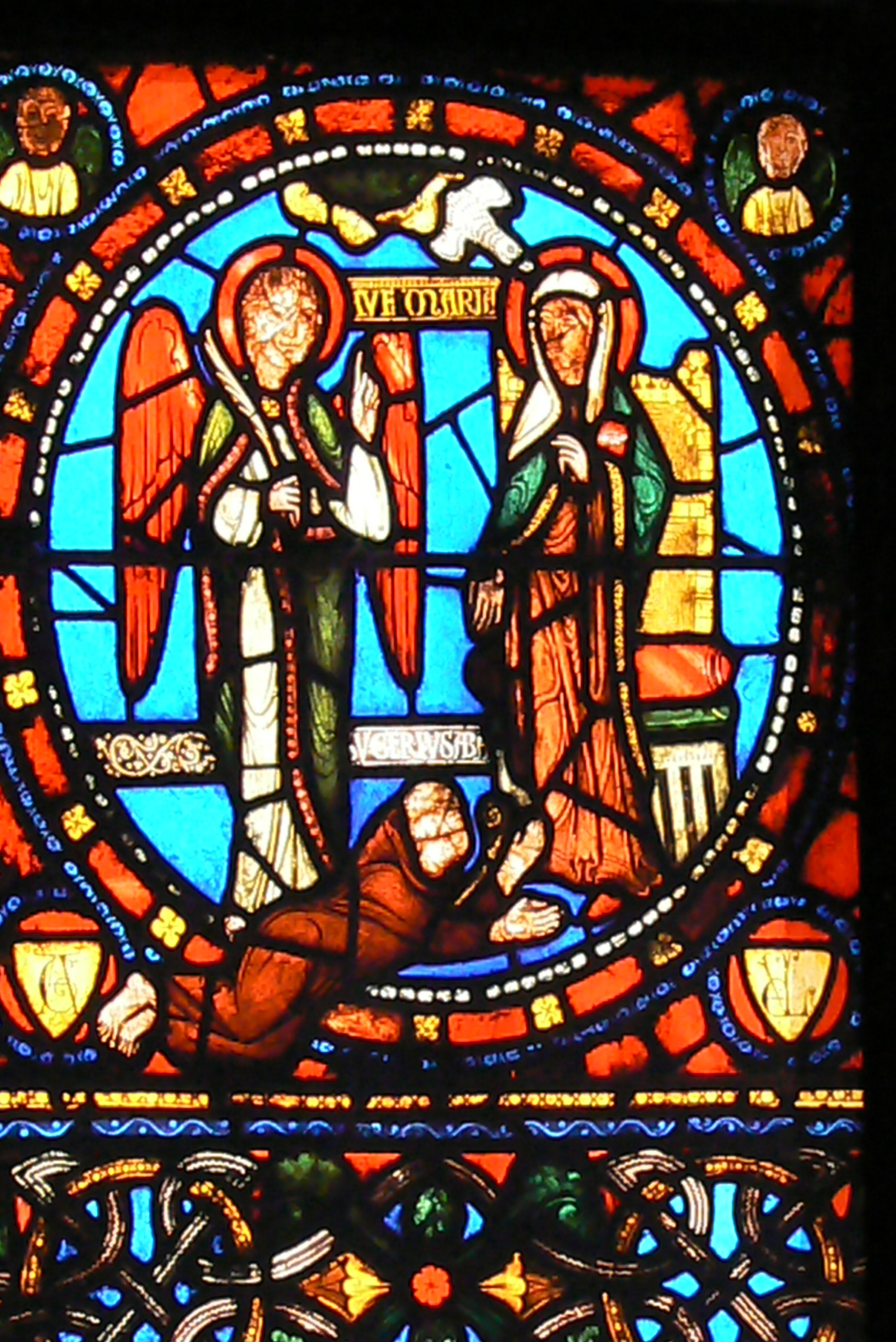
12th century stained glass from Basilica of Saint-Denis

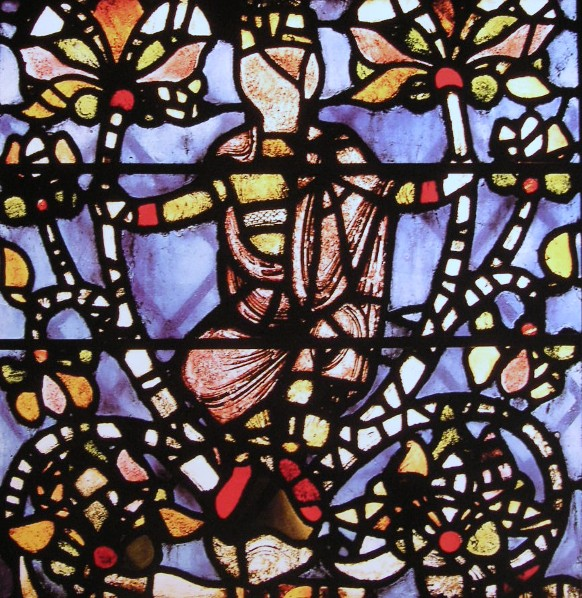
Detail of a Tree of Jesse from York Minster (c. 1170), the oldest stained-glass window in England.

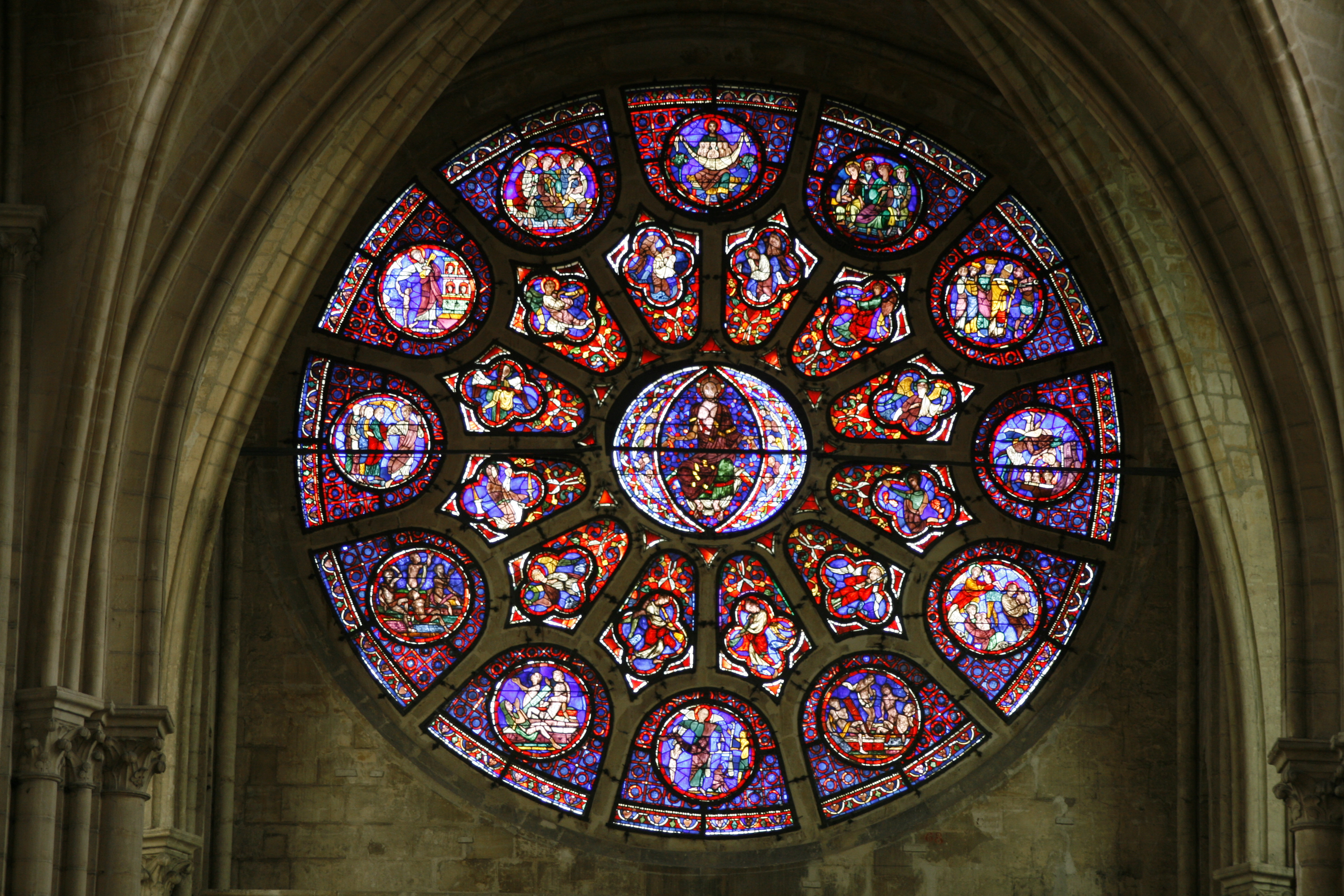
Rose window of Notre Dame de Mantes (c. 1210)

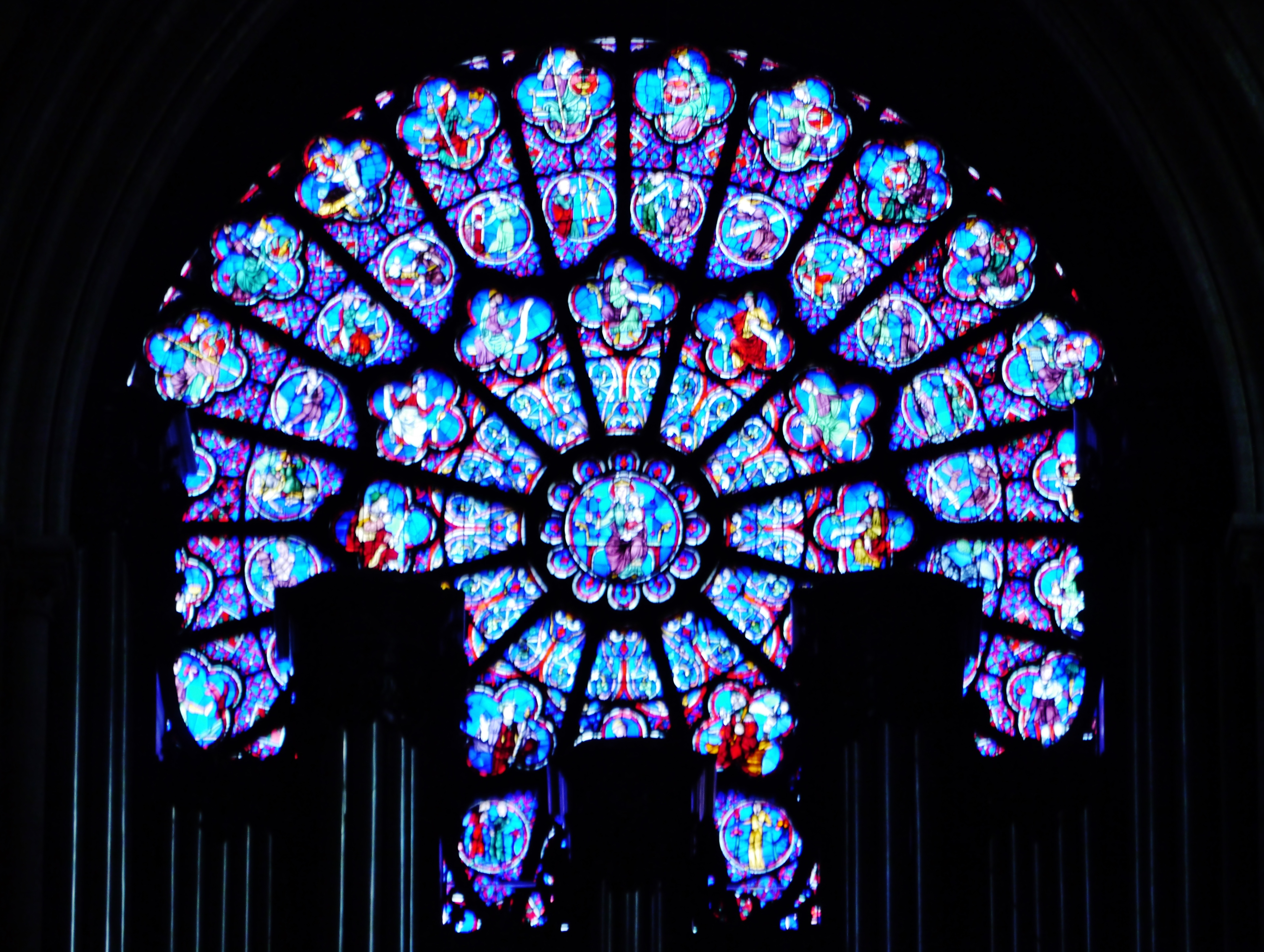
West rose window of Notre Dame de Paris (c. 1220)

== See also ==
- Gothic architecture
- Gothic cathedrals and churches
- High Gothic
- Rayonnant
- Flamboyant
- French Gothic architecture
- English Gothic architecture
- Architecture of Normandy

== Bibliography ==
- Bony, Jean (1985). French Gothic Architecture of the Twelfth and Thirteenth Centuries. University of California Press. ISBN 0-520-05586-1.
- Ducher, Robert (2014). Caractéristique des Styles (in French). Flammarion. ISBN 978-2-0813-4383-2.
- Houvet, E (2019). Miller, Malcolm B (ed.). Chartres - Guide of the Cathedral. Éditions Houvet. ISBN 2-909575-65-9.
- Mignon, Olivier (2015). Architecture des Cathédrales Gothiques (in French). Éditions Ouest-France. ISBN 978-2-7373-6535-5.
- Mignon, Olivier (2017). Architecture du Patrimoine Française - Abbayes, Églises, Cathédrales et Châteaux (in French). Éditions Ouest-France. ISBN 978-27373-7611-5.
- Renault, Christophe; Lazé, Christophe (2006). Les Styles de l'architecture et du mobilier (in French). Gisserot. ISBN 9-782877-474658.
- Rivière, Rémi; Lavoye, Agnès (2007). La Tour Jean sans Peur, Association des Amis de la tour Jean sans Peur. ISBN 978-2-95164-940-8
- Trintignac, André; Coloni, Marie-Jeanne (1984). Decouvrir Notre-Dame de Paris (in French). Paris: Cerf. ISBN 2-204-02087-7.
- Texier, Simon, (2012), Paris Panorama de l'architecture de l'Antiquité à nos jours, Parigramme, Paris (in French), ISBN 978-2-84096-667-8
- Watkin, David (1986). A History of Western Architecture. Barrie and Jenkins. ISBN 0-7126-1279-3.
- Wenzler, Claude (2018), Cathédales Cothiques - un Défi Médiéval, Éditions Ouest-France, Rennes (in French) ISBN 978-2-7373-7712-9
- Le Guide du Patrimoine en France (2002), Éditions du Patrimoine, Centre des Monuments Nationaux (in French) ISBN 978-2-85822-760-0
- Hamilton, Bernard (2003). The Christian World of the Middle Ages. The History Press. ISBN 9780752494760.
- Lawrence, C. H. (2001). Medieval Monasticism: Forms of Religious Life in Western Europe in the Middle Ages. New York: Longman. ISBN 978-0-582-40427-4.
