= Early English Gothic =

Medieval English architectural style

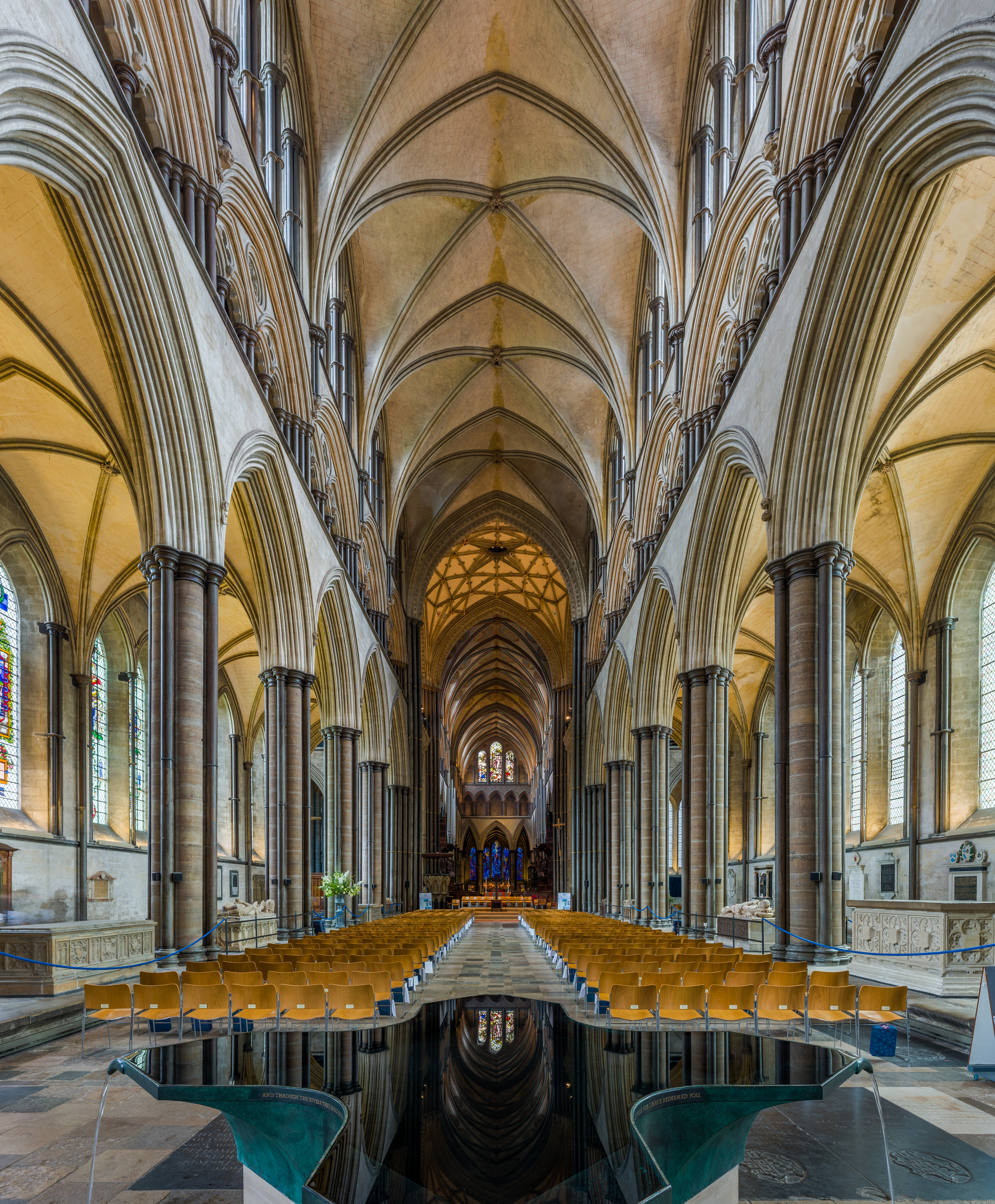
- Salisbury Cathedral
- Years active: c.1175-late 13th century
- Location: England, Scotland
- Major figures: William of Sens, William the Englishman, Geoffrey de Noiers, Alexander the Mason, Elias of Dereham
- Influences: Early Gothic architecture, Norman architecture
- Influenced: Decorated Gothic

Early English Gothic (also First Pointed, Lancet Gothic or Early Gothic, abbreviated to E.E.) was the first phase of English Gothic architecture, distinguished by pointed arches, lancet windows and rib vaults. It emerged from a combination of English Romanesque (Norman) and French Early Gothic (Primary Gothic) architecture, and was primarily used in churches. While it was related to contemporary French architecture, it had important differences that made it distinctively English, such as low interiors, flat (not apsidal) east ends to churches and thick walls. The first notable buildings were constructed in the style in the 1170s-90s, including Wells Cathedral and Lincoln Cathedral. While the style was centred on England and the English-controlled parts of Wales, it was also used in Scotland.

== History ==
=== Influences ===
Since the Norman Conquest, English buildings had been constructed in the Romanesque style, with rounded arches and thick walls, as were all masonry buildings in western Europe. However, shortly before 1100 two important and related changes occurred. The first was the introduction of the pointed arch, possibly derived from Arabic architecture and seen in the very influential abbey church of Cluny. The second was the invention of the ribbed vault. Previously churches had been covered by simple and heavy barrel or groin vaults, or by timber ceilings (the latter being near-ubiquitous in England). The new ribbed vault allowed a lighter construction, with larger window, thinner walls, and buttresses taking the concentrated loads. The drawback was that a ribbed vault of round arches could only cover square bays. Combining the ribbed vault with the pointed arch, probably first done at Durham, allowed vaults to cover buildings of any shape. At the same time, the quality of masonry was improving (as can be seen by comparing the transepts (1079–93) and tower (post-1107) of Winchester Cathedral), allowing more precise construction.

The potential of these changes was first realised in full at the Abbey of Saint Denis near Paris (1140–44), which combined pointed arches, ribbed vaults and thin walls of well-dressed stone to produce the first Gothic building. The new style spread rapidly across northern France, being well established by the 1160s, but did not as yet cross over to England.

=== Transitional architecture ===
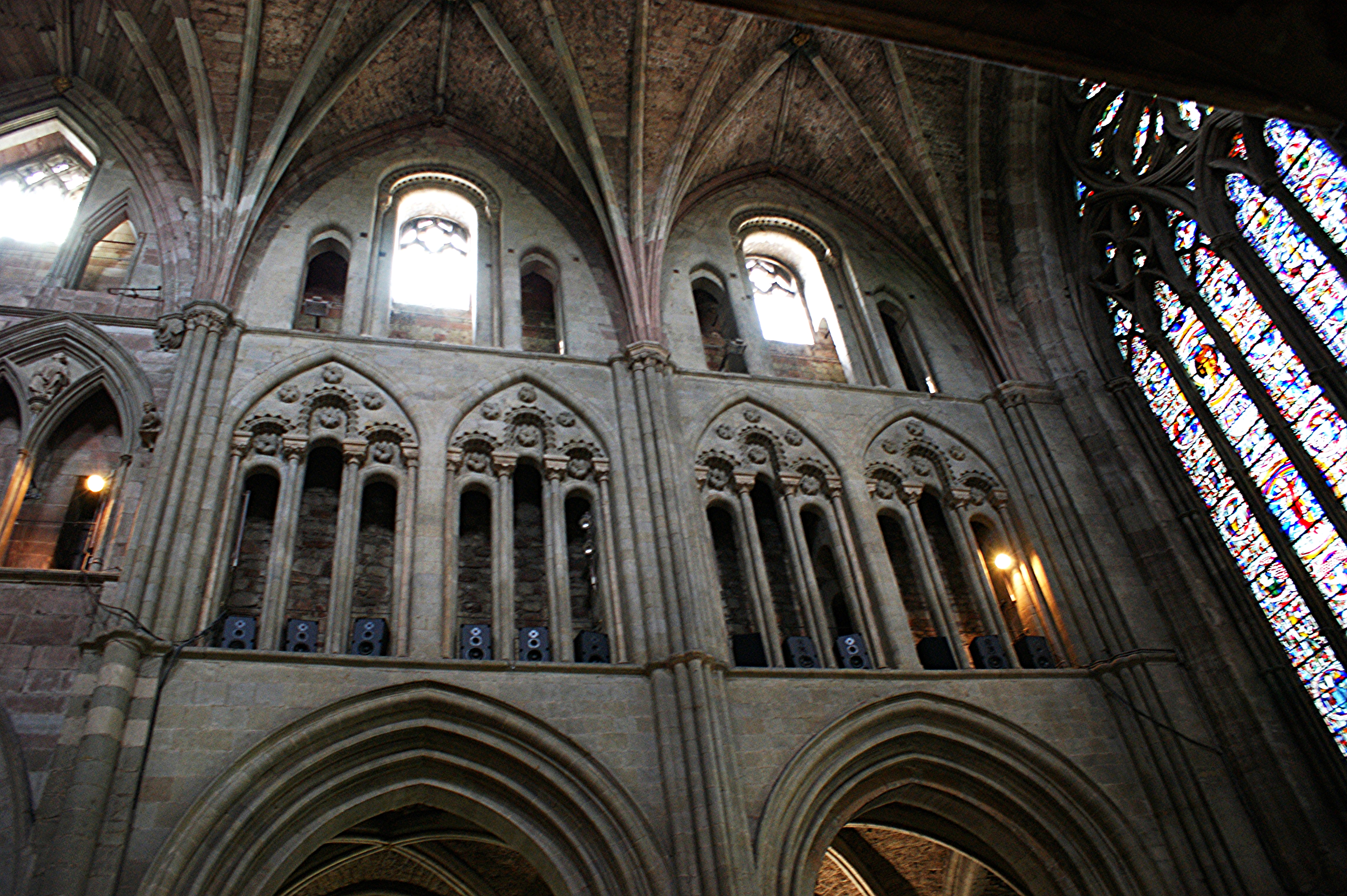
Transitional work at the west end of Worcester Cathedral

As pointed arches and finer mouldings became more common across Europe, so English builders tried to combine them with their existing Romanesque repertoire. The result was the so-called Transitional style. It can be identified by surprising combinations of arches and mouldings, such as rounded arches with delicate mouldings, and pointed arches with vigorous zigzag (as at Cartmel Priory and the chapter house vestibule of Bristol Cathedral). The continued use of Romanesque features was not necessarily just the product of conservative masons; it could also stem from deliberate archaism, to emphasise the ancientness and therefore authority of an institution. This has been argued in the case of the rebuilding of Glastonbury Abbey after 1184, when the new Lady Chapel was given prominent Norman characteristics, possibly to establish a connection with both the ancient Saxon timber church that had preceded it and the more recent Norman embellishment of the abbey, in the face of rivalry with the newly Gothic Wells Cathedral.

=== The Cistercians ===
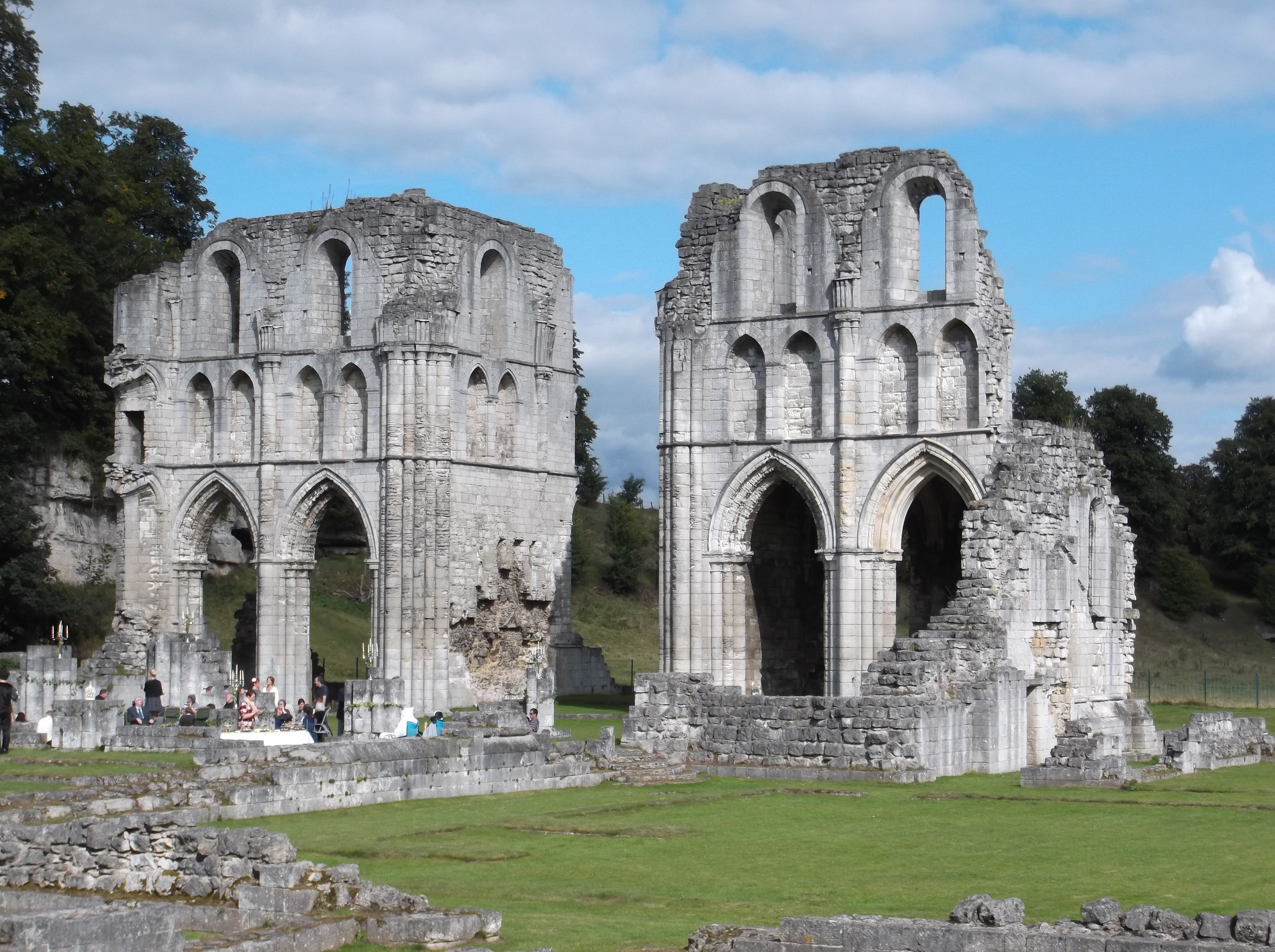
The transepts of Roche Abbey

While England largely ignored the mid-12th century architecture of northern France, the Cistercian order of monks independently introduced a Burgundian form of austere Gothic, in keeping with their religious ideals. This was characterised by the use of a blank wall instead of a triforium, the combination of pointed major arches with rounded windows, columns of eight shafts, fleshy waterleaf capitals (with upturned corners) and flat east ends. Examples include the abbeys of Byland, Fountains, Furness, Kirkstall and Roche. By this mean the pointed arch was well established in northern England before the works at Canterbury were begun. One of the main non-Cistercian buildings to use these forms seems to have been Archbishop Roger's rebuilding of the east end of York Minster. This has now gone, but the surviving work of the 1160s at Ripon (choir, transepts and nave ends) gives an impression of its form. The near-intact church of the Augustinian Brinkburn Priory exhibits a similar style.

=== Canterbury Cathedral ===
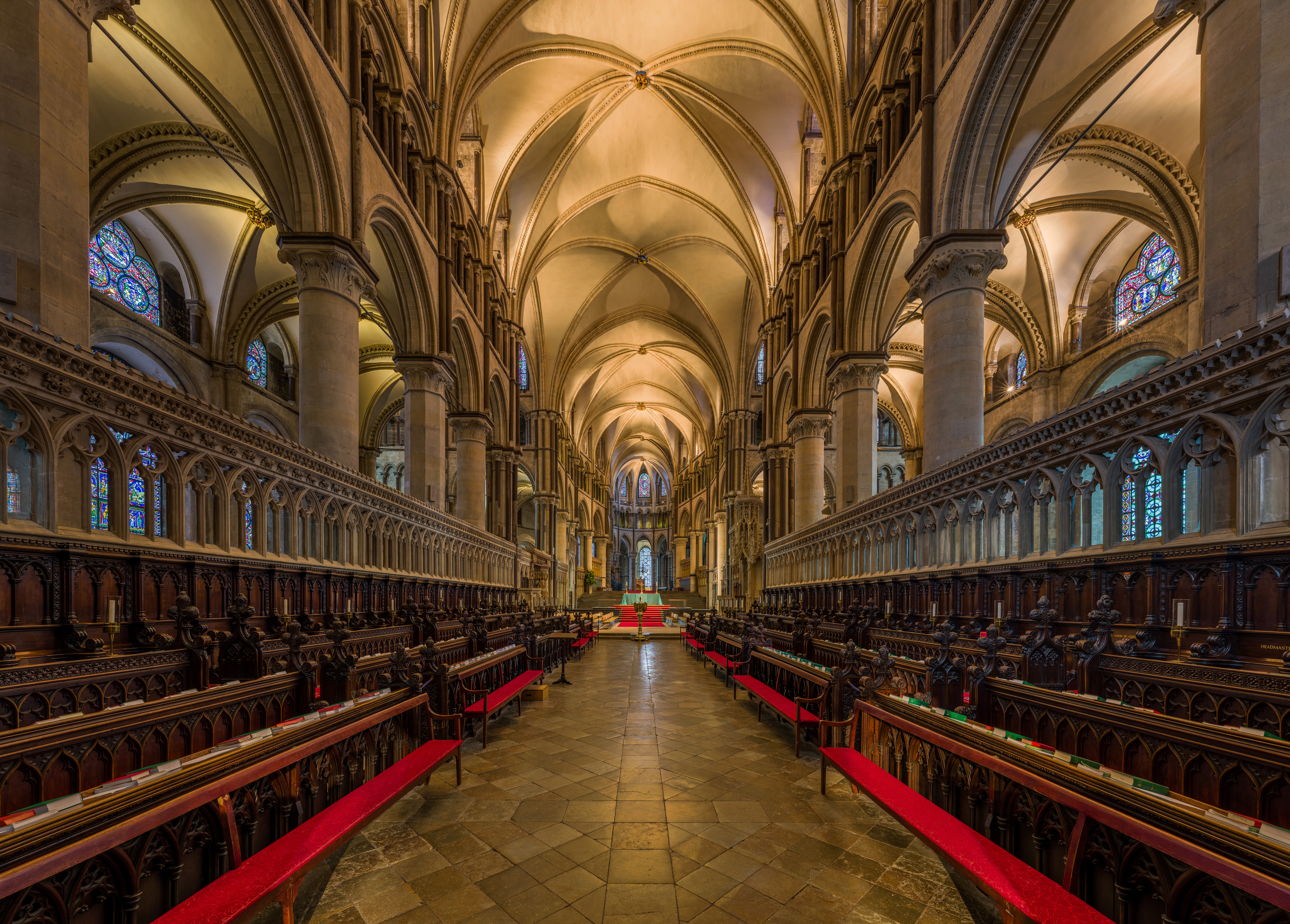
The choir of Canterbury Cathedral. The work in the foreground is by William of Sens, while that in the background is by William the Englishman.

In 1170, Archbishop Thomas Becket was murdered in his own cathedral at Canterbury, sparking a hugely popular pilgrimage cult. Following this, in 1174, the east end of the church was destroyed by fire. The monks gathered masons from France and England before entrusting the reconstruction to William of Sens. He may have been involved in the rebuilding of Sens Cathedral, though he was not (as was previously believed) its designer. He oversaw the demolition of much of the burnt-out choir and the construction of a new choir within its shell, before he fell from the scaffolding and was replaced as master mason by William the Englishman. The new building had to be more splendid than its predecessor and contemporaries, and had to accommodate the vast crowds of pilgrims to Becket's shrine in suitable dignity.

From what was built at Canterbury, William of Sens' influences seem to have been drawn from across northern France, perhaps especially from the destroyed cathedrals at Arras and Cambrai. This meant that the new work at Canterbury was a synthesis of the previous three decades of French Gothic developments, as well as English tastes. The pointed arches, wide lancets, sexpartite vault and general elevation are French in origin, from various sources, while the thick walls, the use of galleries and the lowness of the vault are more native features, conditioned by the constraints of the retained shell and the tastes of the monastery. Some features, like the multi-coloured marble shafts, were occasionally used in France, but became very popular in England. William the Englishman introduced references to more recent French buildings at Reims and Laon, with larger windows and flying buttresses, but also influential features not derived from France, like round abaci above capitals. Canterbury introduced the Gothic style to England and had close adherents in buildings like Rochester Cathedral, but no English church appeared quite as French as Canterbury until Westminster Abbey in 1245.

Another building which was closely related to Canterbury was Chichester Cathedral. The east end was extended with a retrochoir which featured the exotic marble columns and volute capitals of Canterbury, but with a greater use of rounded arches to blend with the existing Norman church. The nave was reclad in a similar style after a fire in 1187. Canterbury also influenced the reconstruction of Nidaros Cathedral, in Norway, begun in 1183. Like Canterbury, Nidaros housed a martyr-saint, and constructed a centralised shrine chapel in imitation of Canterbury's eastern Corona chapel.

=== Early examples - Wells and Lincoln ===
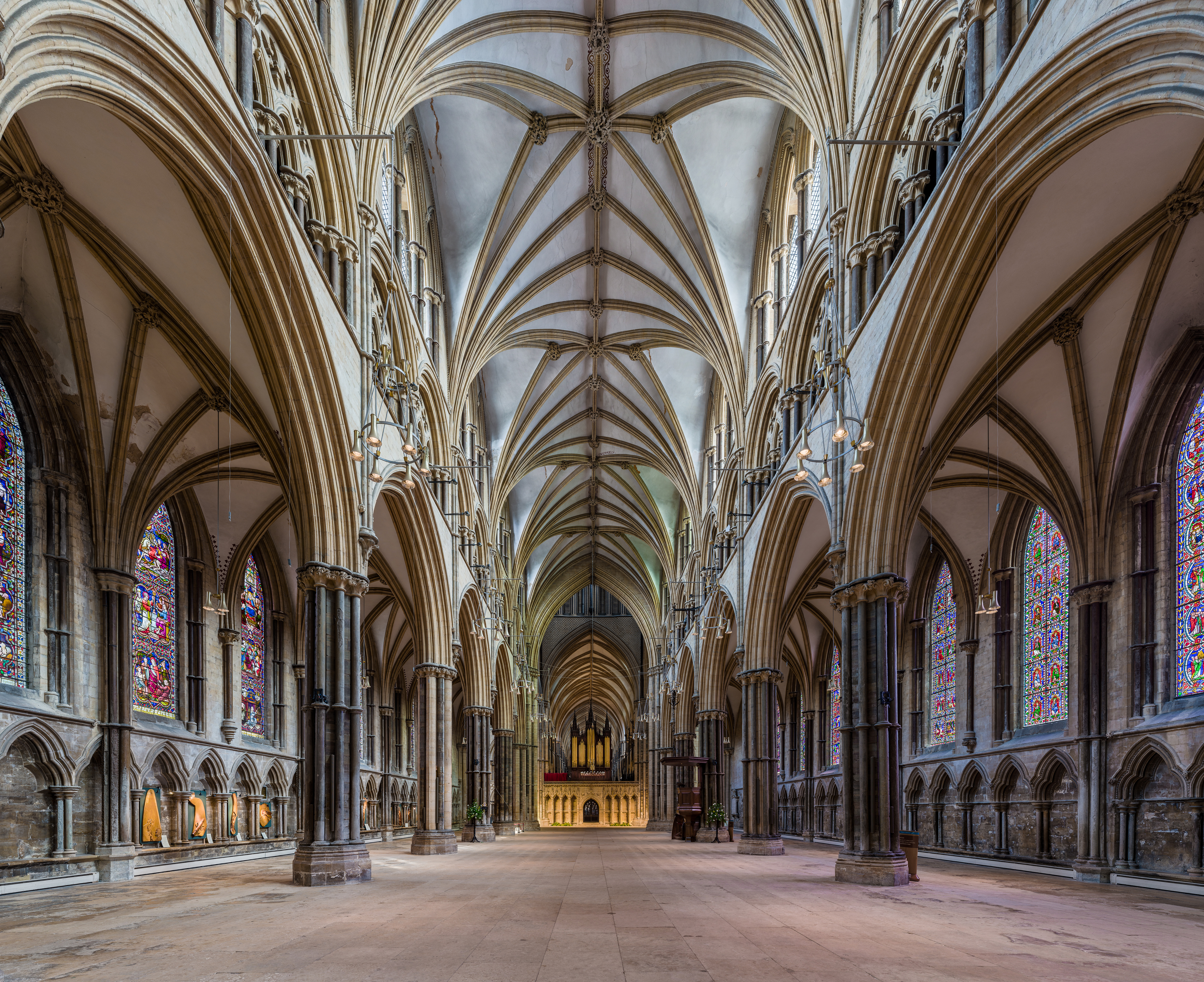
The nave of Lincoln Cathedral

After Canterbury, all great church buildings were Gothic in style, but designers' responses to the innovations and French features presented at Canterbury varied. At Lincoln, rebuilt from 1192 after an earthquake in 1185, many of the forms were initially derived from Canterbury (sexpartite vaults, paired triforium openings, wide lancets), but the emphasis was changed to create a broader and richer building. For example, the plain round columns seen at Canterbury were replaced by clustered piers, and the smooth dado below the windows was exchanged for a very complex syncopated blind arcade. The first phase, encompassing the east end of the building, was the work of Geoffrey de Noiers, while the nave was built by Alexander the Mason, who simplified the blind arcade, added more Purbeck marble and increased the bay widths. Additional elaboration was provided by the use of tierceron vaults, instead of the simple sexpartite or quadripartite vaults used in France. The result was a building with little resemblance to its ultimate French precedents.

A new school of Gothic emerged in western England and south Wales in the 1180s, responding to different French precedents to those seen at Canterbury. Its earliest buildings included Dore Abbey, Worcester Cathedral (west bays), St Davids Cathedral and, most spectacularly, the vast church at Glastonbury Abbey. The culmination of this school was Wells Cathedral, begun some time before 1186, and largely completed by 1215. This makes it the earliest English building to use entirely pointed arches (as Canterbury had round ones in the aisles and triforium). Its bay division is virtually absent, with no vaulting shafts in the nave and a horizontal band of triforium running straight to the crossing. The piers are also unusually complex, creating a contrast of ornate arcade and simple upper parts that has little obvious precedent in England or France. Wells also has the grandest Early English west front, covered in statuary and with deep buttresses, unlike the flat fronts of later work.

=== Mature Early English ===
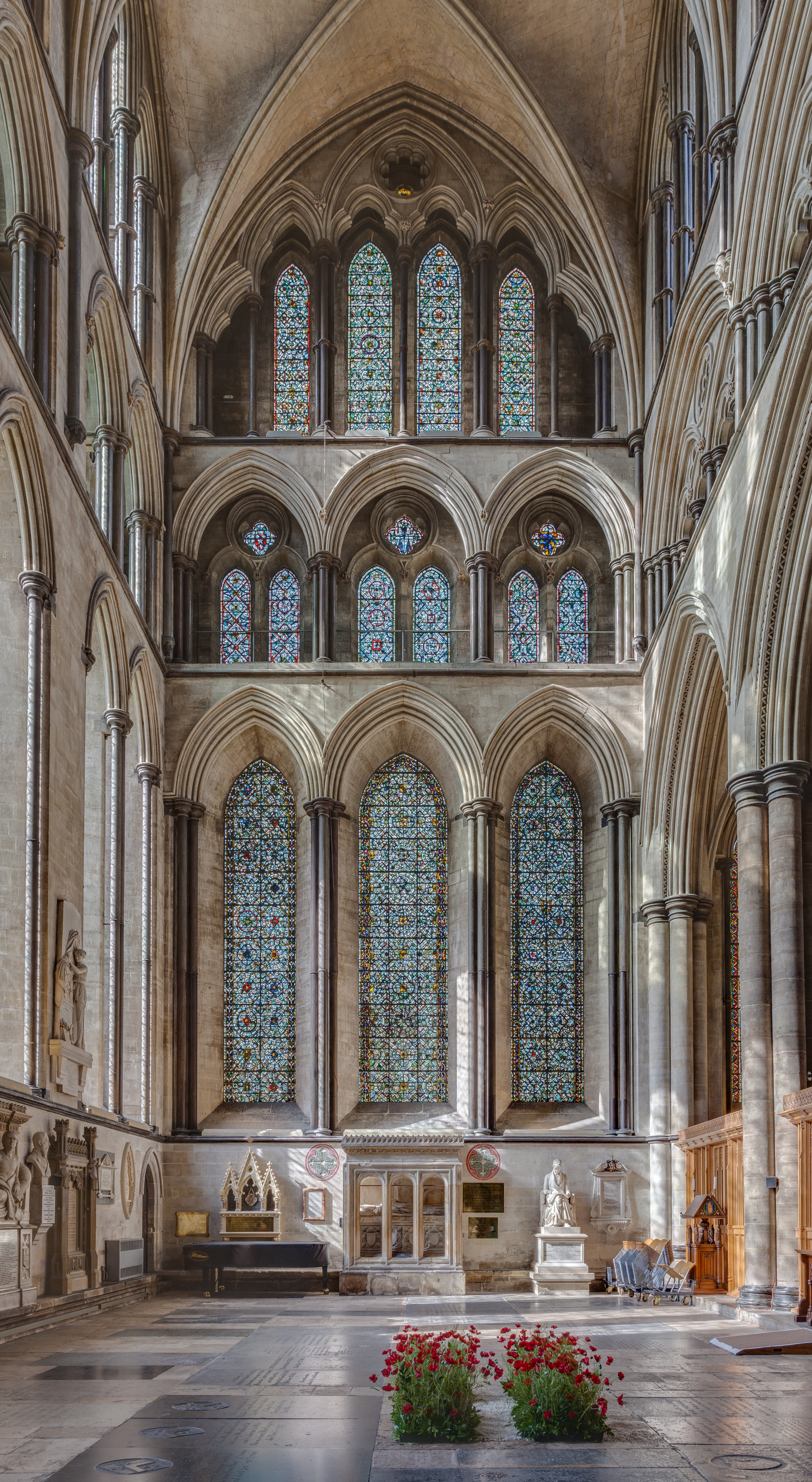
The north transept of Salisbury Cathedral

The horizontality of Wells had few direct successors besides Salisbury (1220–84), the most complete and most austere Early English cathedral. This has the same low triforium and quadripartite vault, but simplifies the Wells pattern with bell capitals and plain Purbeck-shafted round piers. The outside is similarly plain, without sculpture or carving except on the towerless west front. This restraint was echoed in some prominent buildings connected with Archbishop Stephen Langton's reformist movement (or, in other interpretations, the architectural oversight of Elias of Dereham), such as the choir (consecrated in 1240) at Temple Church and the chapel at Lambeth Palace, both in London.

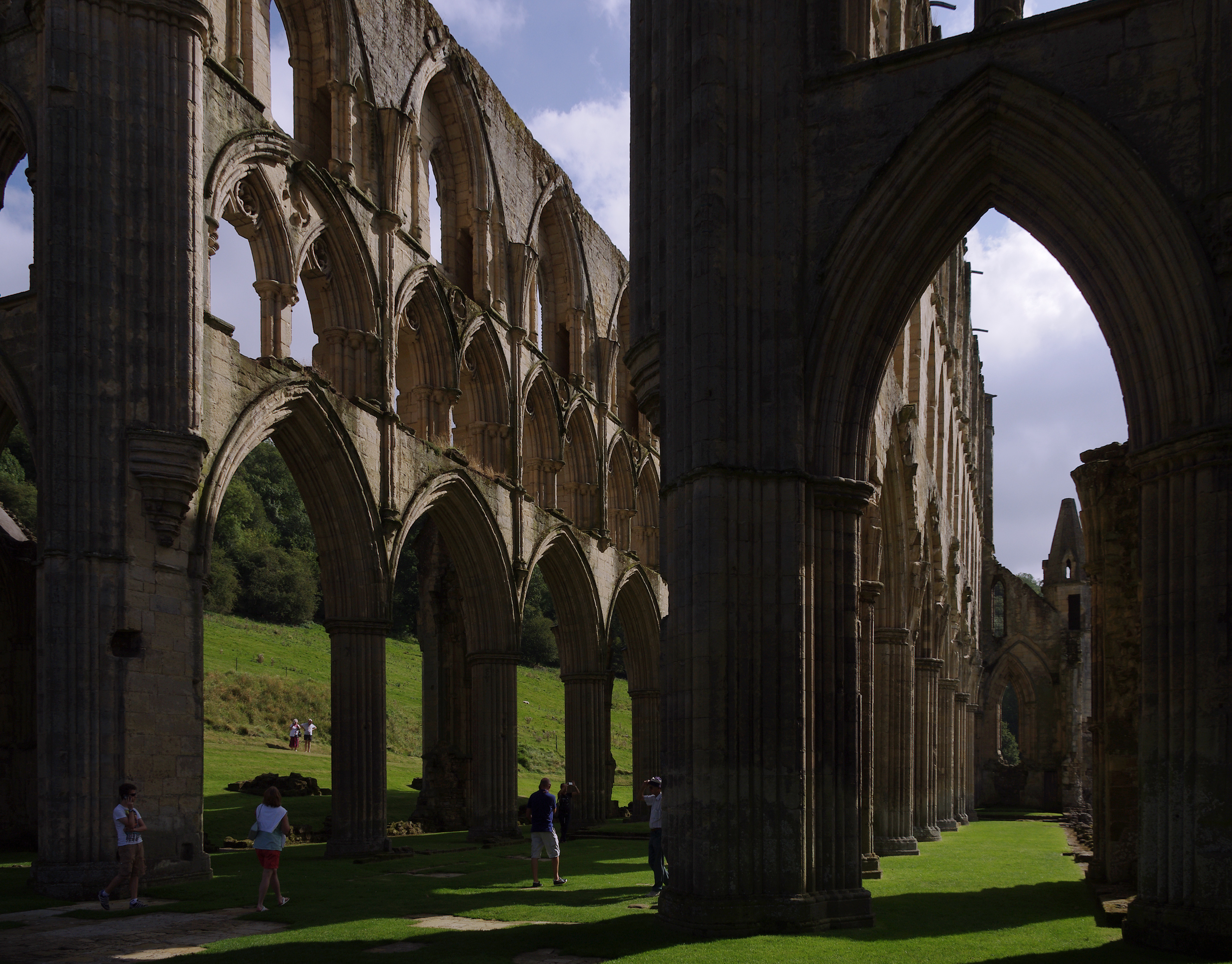
The transepts and choir of Rievaulx Abbey

The more ornate treatment at Lincoln, on the other hand, proved very influential. The most direct copy was Bishop Northwold's presbytery extension at Ely (c.1234-52). This was perhaps the most elaborate English interior to date, applying dog-tooth, cusping, traceried cut-outs and foliage sprays to every feature to create an exceptionally rich elevation. Lincoln also influenced the east end of Rievaulx Abbey - the Cistercians were moving away from their earlier austerity - which in turn was a source for much Scottish architecture.

A further artistic centre emerged at York, where the transepts were rebuilt on a colossal scale from the 1220s. This was related to ongoing works at Hexham, and had extremely tall lancets and round arches over the triforium. Whitby Abbey belongs to this school, as does the Chapel of the Nine Altars at Durham.

Thus by the mid-13th century Early English was ubiquitous across England, as parish churches were rebuilt by masons emerging from the cathedral workshops (seen for example in the unusual columns in Lincolnshire derived from that cathedral), and the style could be used to rich or austere effect, with distinct regional variations.

=== Scotland ===
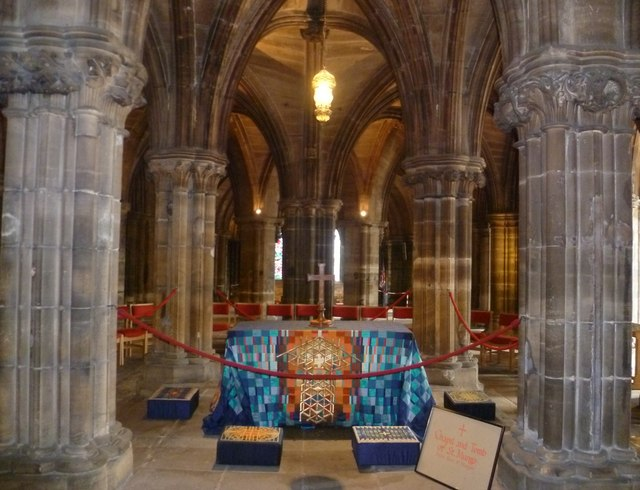
The crypt at Glasgow Cathedral, showing the elaborated columns clustered round the former shrine of St Kentigern.

Though Scotland was a separate kingdom, the 13th century was a period of peace and close ties with England. The only major architectural influence at this time was English. As in England, some of the earliest importers of Gothic forms were the Cistercians. Unlike in England, Scotland did not see major Romanesque cathedral construction (except Kirkwall, then part of Norway), so the Early English work generally forms the primary fabric. Though Scotland had fewer large cathedrals than England, those that were built were of high quality, with important work surviving at Dunblane, Elgin (ruined), Kirkwall and especially Glasgow. The largest and grandest cathedral, St Andrews, was substantially rebuilt in the later middle ages and has been mostly destroyed. While St Andrews, begun in 1160-62, followed northern English Cistercian forms, with octofoil piers and waterleaf capitals, most of the 13th century buildings were derived from Lincoln, either directly or via northern English works such as the choir of Rievaulx. This is especially the case at Glasgow Cathedral (as may be seen in the plate-traceried triforium).

=== Replacement by Decorated ===
In 1245, Henry III began to rebuild the abbey at Westminster. This deliberately copied French buildings, and introduced features that were to radically change English architecture. The most significant of these was bar tracery (though earlier examples may have existed at Binham Priory and Chepstow Castle). This allowed windows to be much larger, finally eradicating the long, thick expanses of wall inherited from Norman architecture. At the same time, carving changed, with stiff-leaf being replaced by naturalistic foliage. Mouldings became broader and less crisp, and the amount of ornamentation in general increased. These changes meant that by the late 13th century, Early English had been superseded by a new style, known as Decorated.

== Features ==
=== Plan forms ===
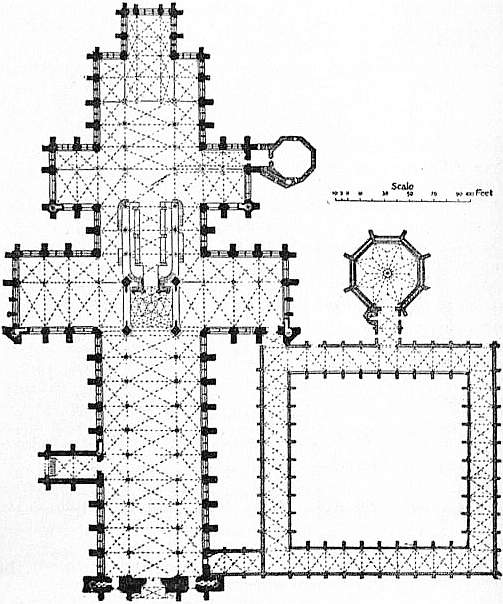
Plan of Salisbury Cathedral (east at top)

Large English churches were very different in plan to French ones. Where a French cathedral like Notre Dame in Paris or Chartres is concentrated, with short nave and choir, barely-projecting transepts and an apsidal chevet behind the high altar, an English cathedral like Lincoln or Salisbury is long, thin and overwhelmingly right-angled. East ends were, except for Canterbury (and formerly Lincoln) and the abbeys of Battle, Beaulieu and Hailes, invariably flat, with either a cliff-like gable end to frame a composition of lancets (as at Ely), or with an ambulatory and series of rectangular chapels (as at Salisbury). Long east ends were required as shrines containing the relics of saints were normally sited in a feretory behind the high altar. Following the phenomenally successful cult of Thomas Becket, the Early English period saw the attempted promotion of many bishop saints, such as Hugh of Avalon and Robert Grosseteste at Lincoln, with varying results. In addition, ancient monasteries with established saints, such as Ely with Ethelreda, promoted their relics with new zeal. The streams of pilgrims visiting such a shrine could disrupt the services in a small Norman east end, so large new extensions were built to allow the circulation of pilgrims. In France, the semicircular chevet solved this problem, but in England, the feretory was generally a rectangular space behind the altar, as at Ely.

Transepts were long to house side chapels and in the grandest cathedrals there could be two pairs. Durham and Fountains Abbey have a variation of this where the transept is pushed to the east end of the building, to make a T-shaped plan. The result of these eastern transepts and chapels was that the east end could be as long as the nave. Due to the unusual feature of many cathedrals being monastic, cloisters were common, even being adopted at secular cathedrals like Lincoln where they were not functionally necessary.

In parish churches, there was general expansion, due to increasing population and changes resulting from the Fourth Lateran Council. This defined transubstantiation, increasing the importance of the eucharist, and indirectly requiring churches to have longer chancels to accommodate the ceremony. These chancels were, as in cathedrals, square-ended. Aisles were frequently added to earlier buildings. Though cruciform churches were still built, it was increasingly common to do away with transepts and have a tower at the west end of the nave.

=== Internal elevations ===
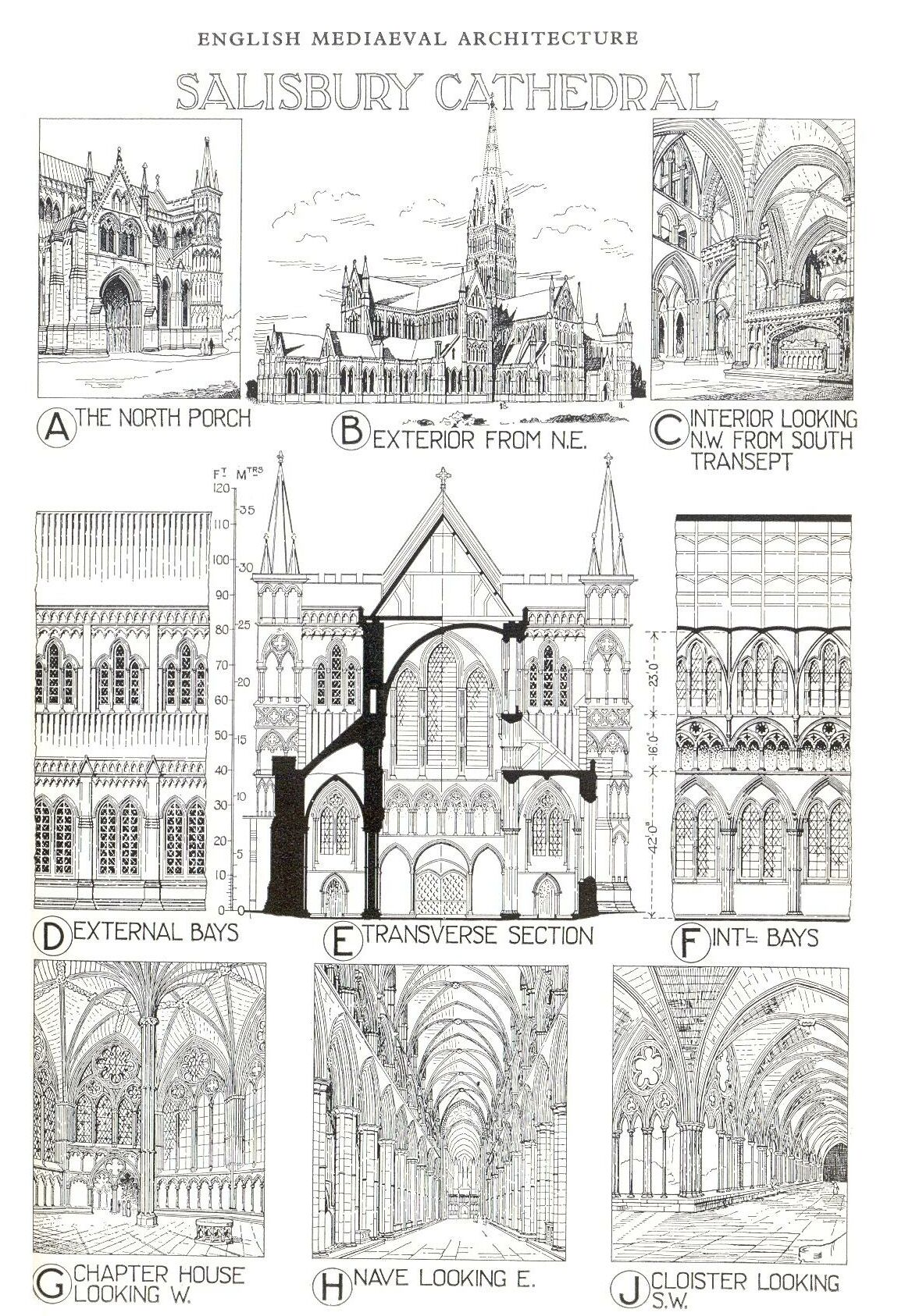
Salisbury Cathedral sections, elevation and views, by Banister Fletcher

The internal elevations of great churches were almost always of three storeys (exceptions include the choir of Southwell Minster and the nave of Dunblane Cathedral) - arcade, triforium or gallery and clerestory. If the church was vaulted, the shafts carrying the vault did not descend to the ground (Southwark Cathedral is an exception), instead springing from corbels at the base of the triforium (or even the clerestory at Wells). This made church interiors appear tunnel-like, a condition exacerbated by the long naves and low vaults. This was a major deviation from French Gothic architecture. The arcade invariably consisted of broad, pointed arches. The treatment of the triforium (a narrow passage) or gallery (a space above the aisle vaults) varied greatly. Canterbury and Lincoln have pairs of arches each in turn divided into two, Wells and Cartmel have a continuous run of small pointed arches, Salisbury has a single squat subdivided pointed arch, and a group in the north (York, Whitby, Hexham) have the same but with a rounded over-arch. The clerestory always had lancet windows, often combined with blind arches, but the composition varied depending on whether or not the building was vaulted. English clerestory windows generally had the glazing set towards the outer face of the thick walls, allowing for a wall-passage behind, even at Canterbury; this feature was uncommon in the thin-walled churches of France.

=== Arches ===
Arches were pointed, except for occasional round arches over pairs of pointed arches. The pitch of a pointed arch may be varied at will, but in the Early English period it was equilateral or occasionally lancet (steeper than equilateral; not to be confused with lancet windows, which may be covered by any arch shape). Minor arches, e.g. in blind arcading, could be trefoiled or cusped.

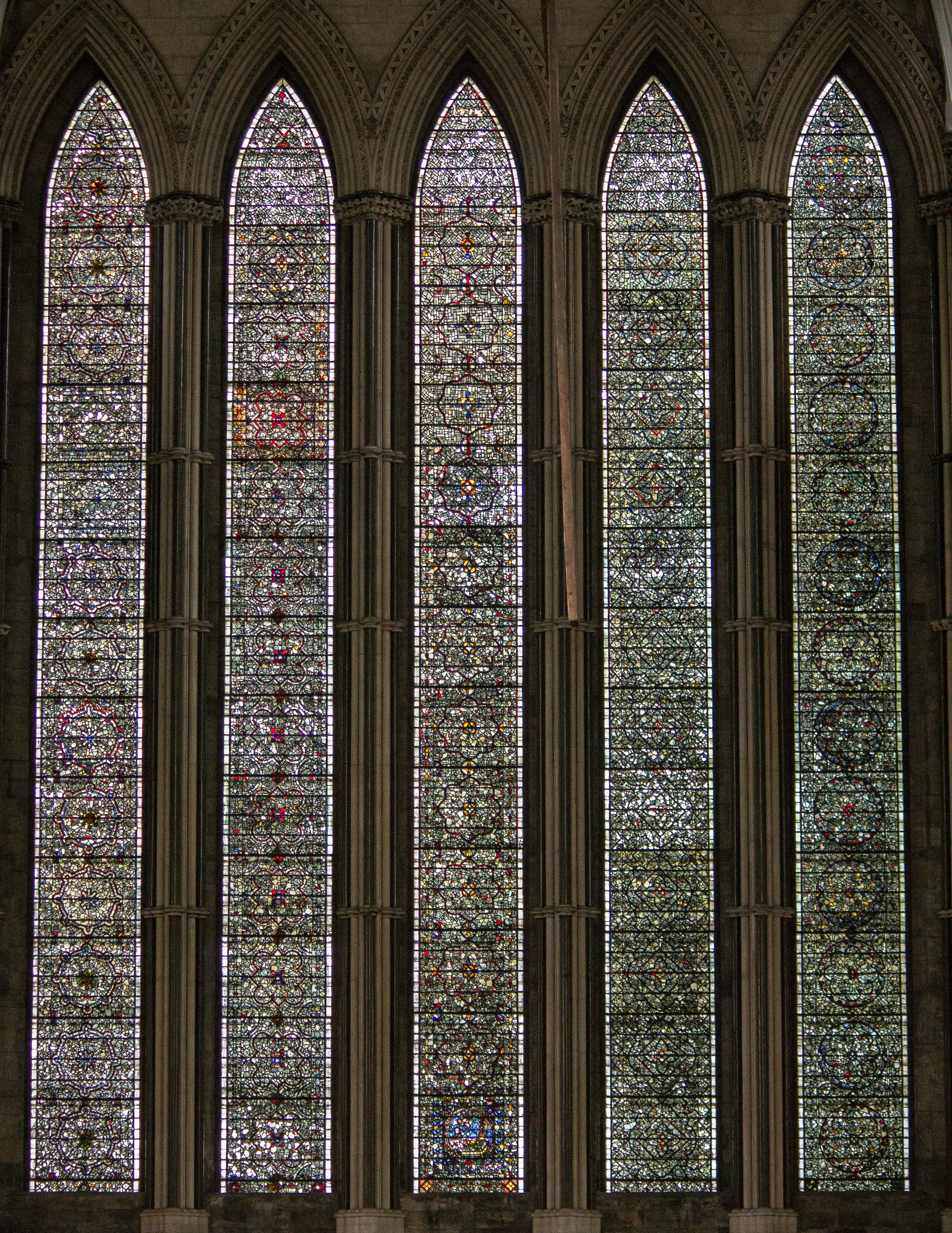
The Five Sisters window at York Minster, with original grisaille glass

=== Windows ===
Windows were generally based on the lancet, appearing singly, in pairs or in groups of three, five or (in two cases only) seven. In northern England, they were generally longer and thinner than in the south, most dramatically at Hexham Abbey and York (where they are 53 feet high). When lancets were paired, they could be placed under a single relieving arch, and the spandrel above them made thinner. The next step was to pierce this thinner spandrel with a glazed shape, creating plate tracery. Rose windows were also used, though seldom, as at Lincoln. Glass was generally brightly coloured, with imagery of saints, miracles and biblical stories, as survives at Canterbury, but a new form was abstract grisaille, in which leaf patterns were made of greyish glass.

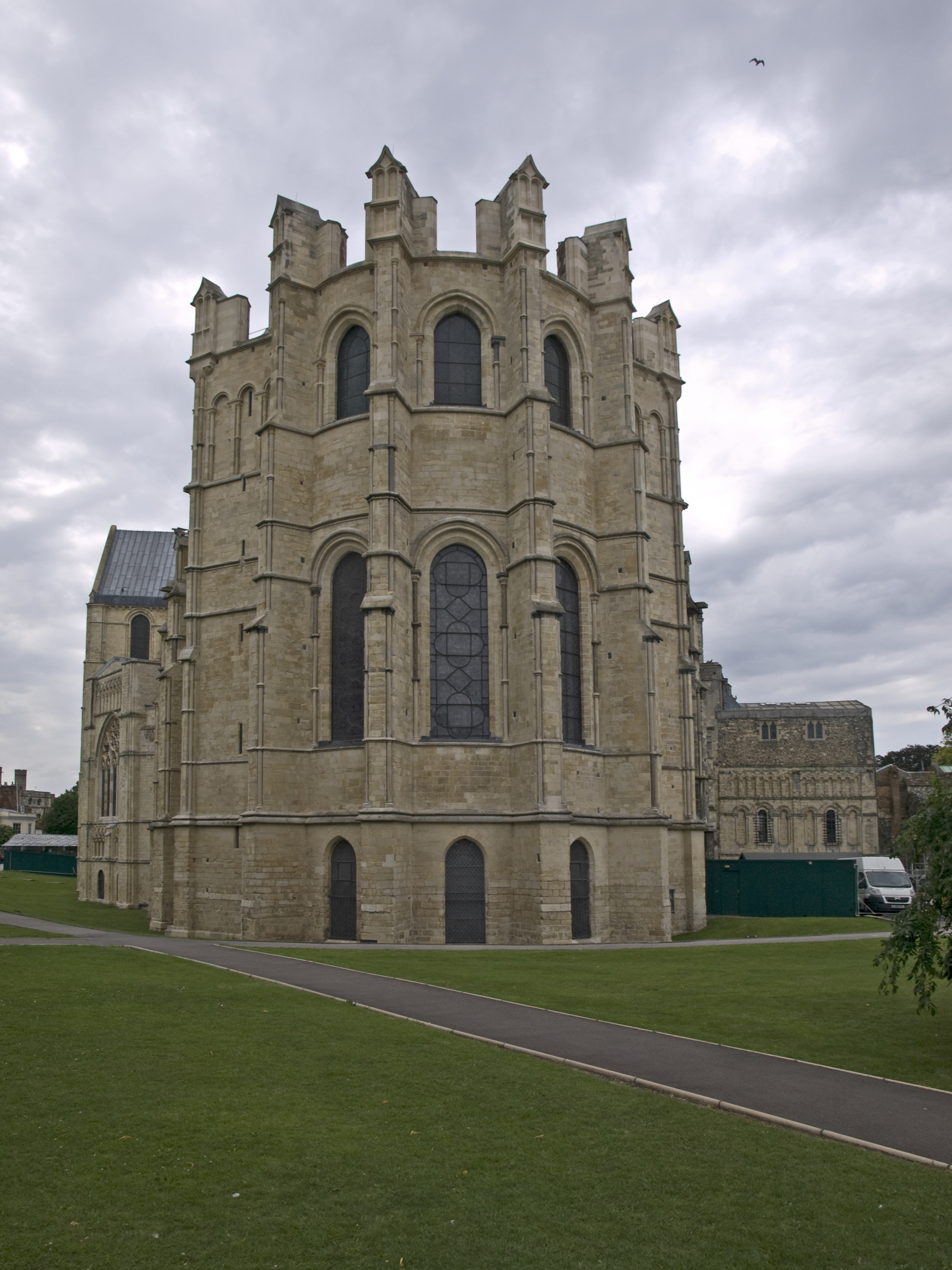
Wide French-style lancets in the Corona at Canterbury

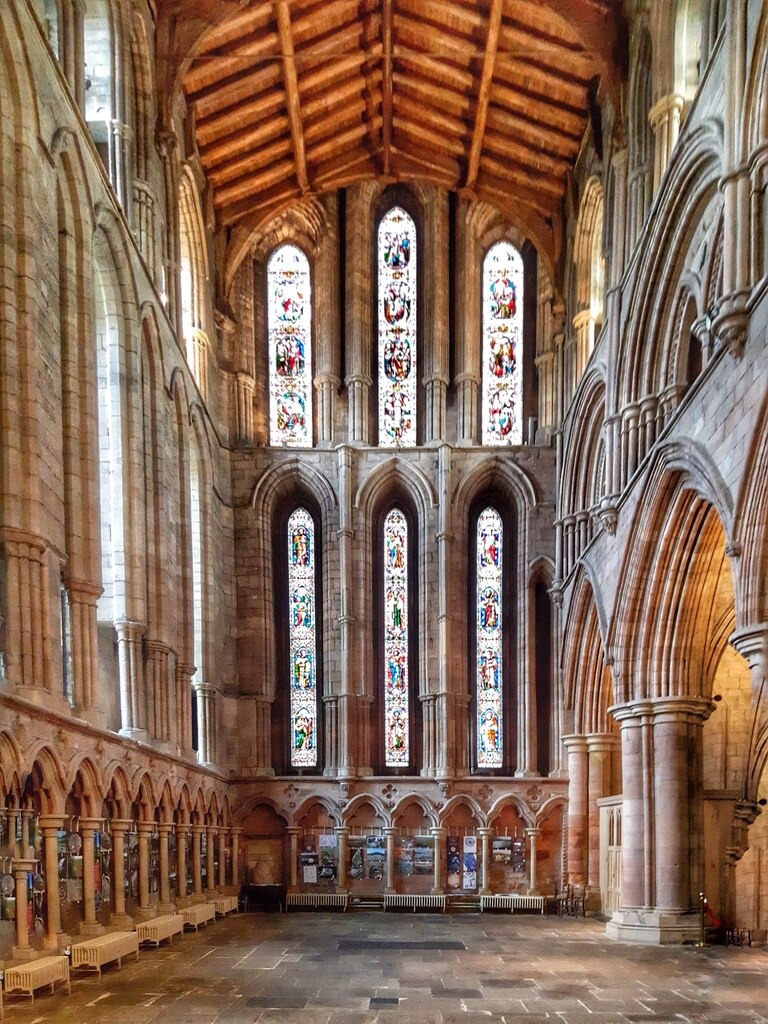
Narrow Northern lancets in the north transept at Hexham

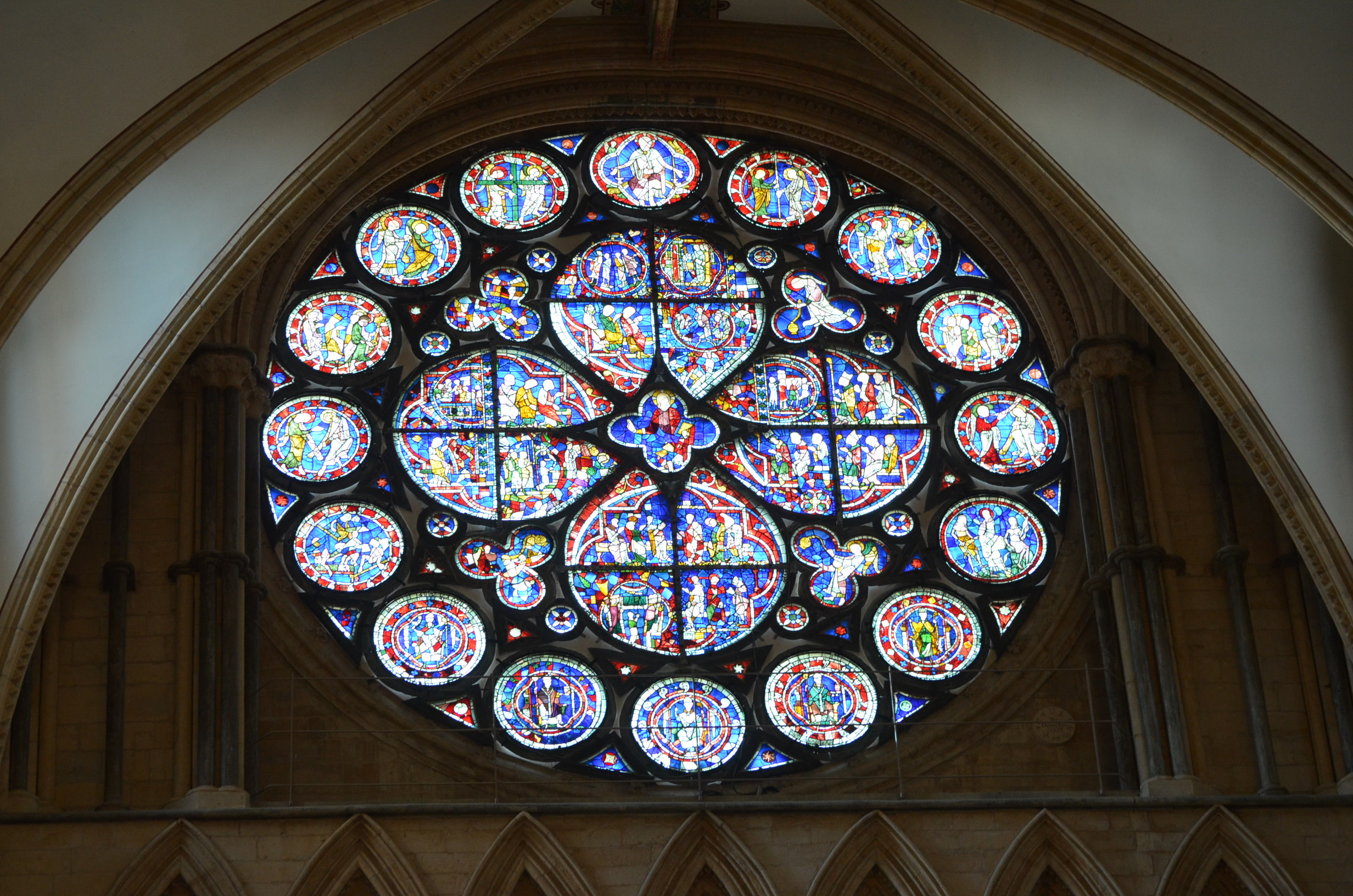
The Dean's Eye rose window at Lincoln

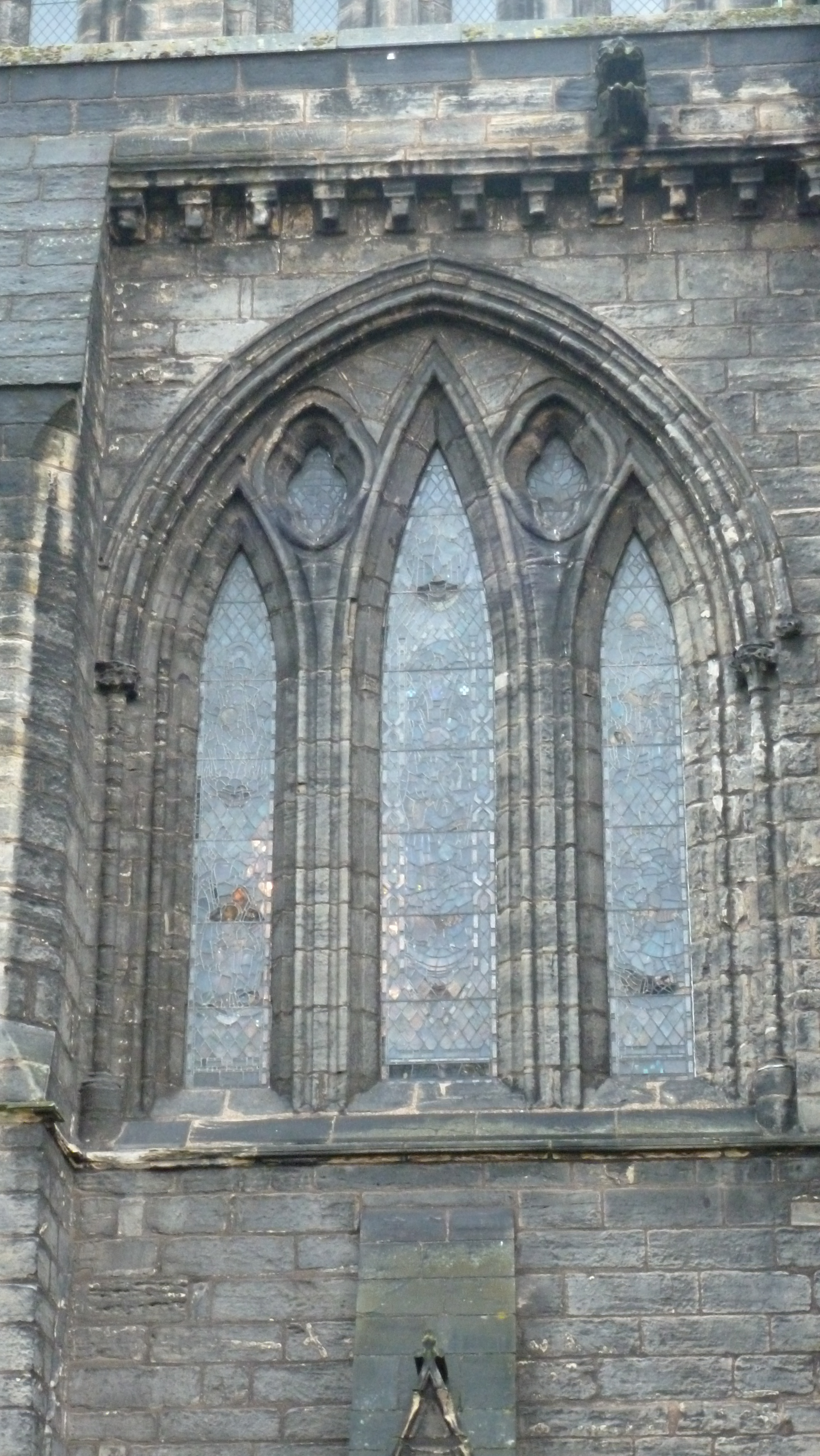
Plate tracery at Glasgow Cathedral

=== Doors ===
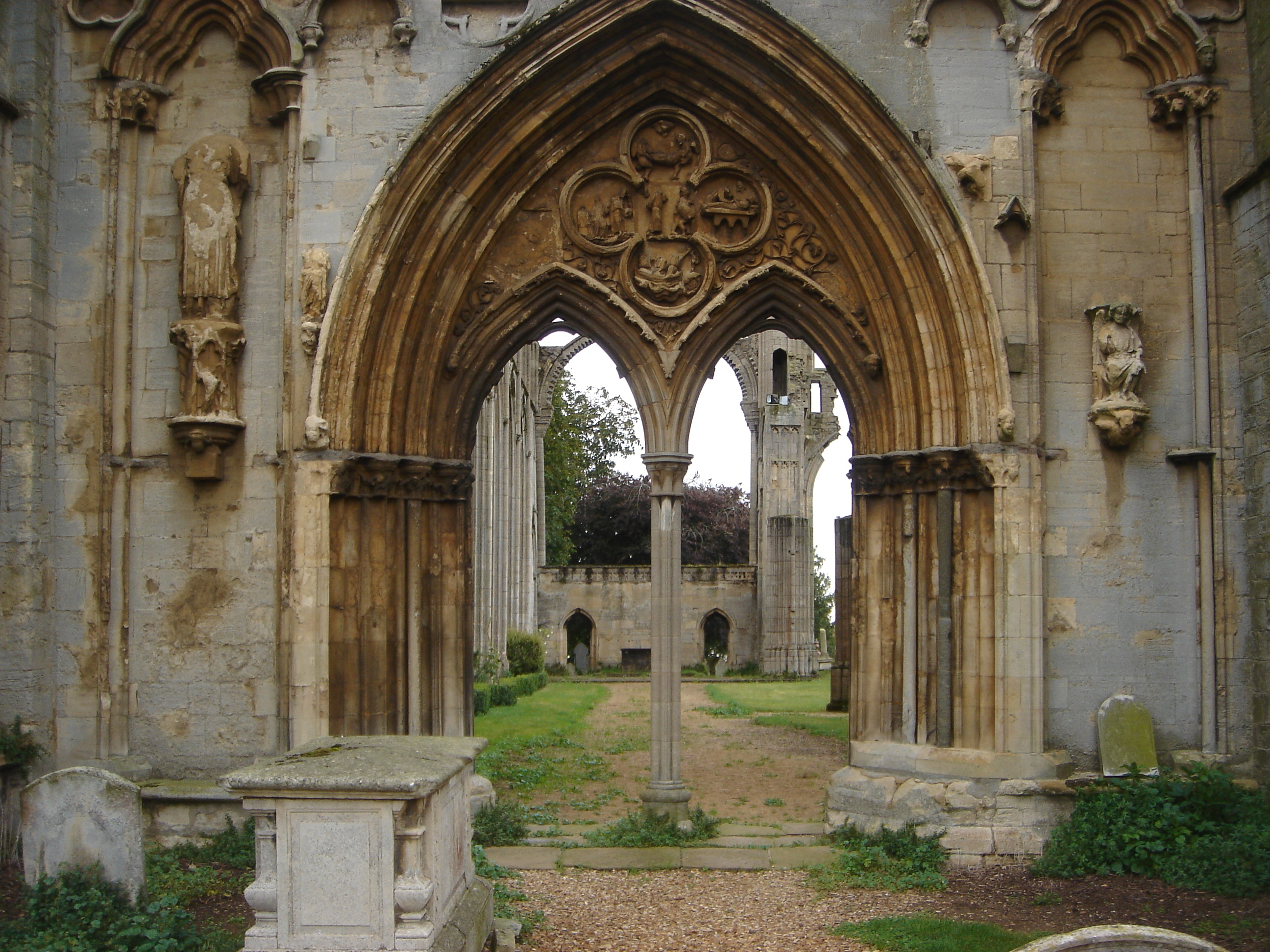
The west door at Crowland Abbey, unusually grand for the period.

Doors were less significant than in French churches, with those at Wells and Peterborough being lost in the giant façades. However, they would be a focus for ornament, with more shafting, dog-tooth mouldings and more elaborate capitals. Notably prominent doors may be seen at Crowland Abbey and Elgin Cathedral. North porches were often more prominent than west doors in cathedrals, as at Wells and Salisbury.

=== Columns ===
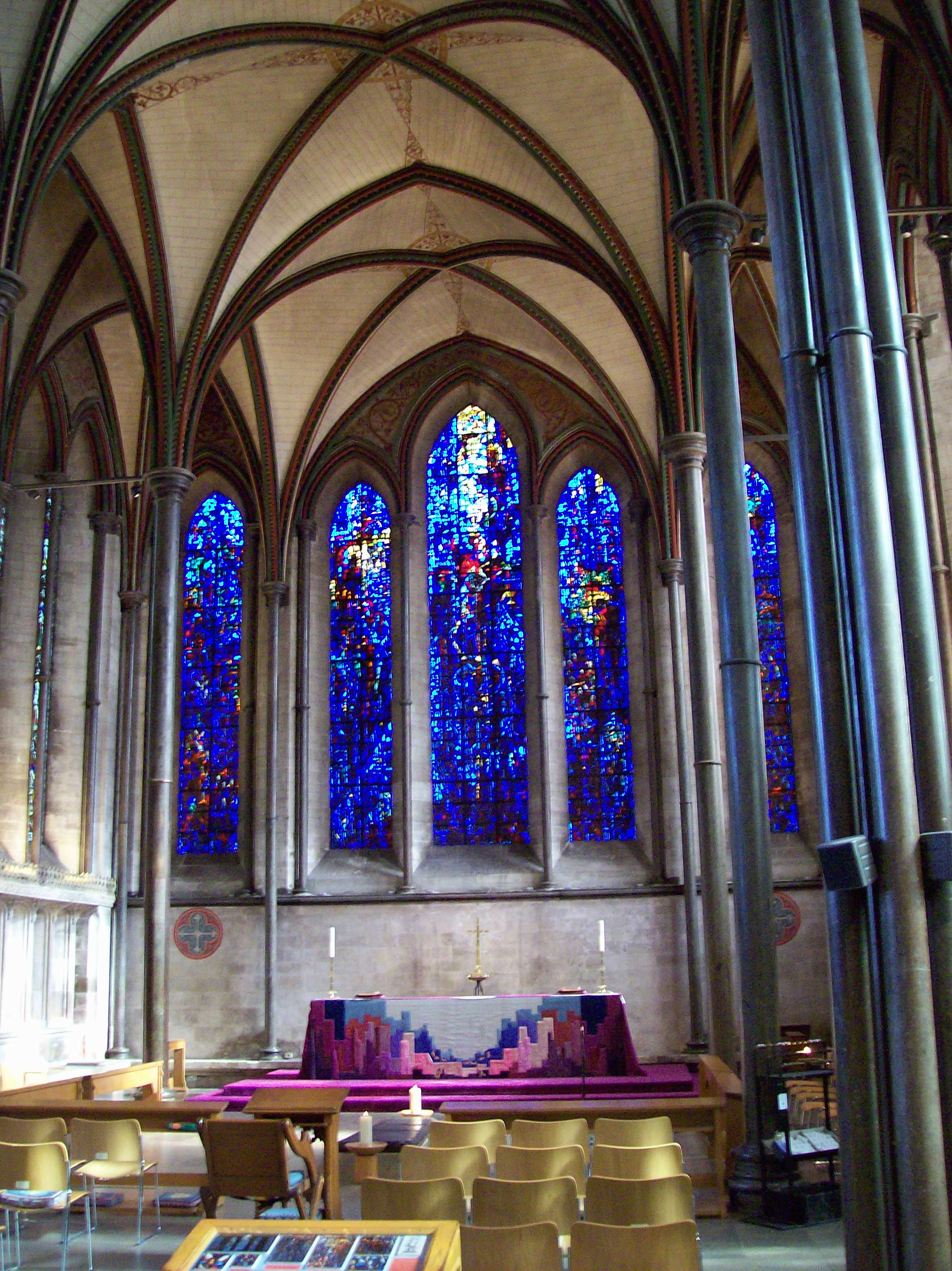
Single shafts carrying the Trinity Chapel vaults at Salisbury

Whereas the columns in French cathedrals had a round core with some detached shafting, English columns were generally formed of clusters of integrated shafts, giving a richer and more linear appearance (Salisbury is an exception). A cluster of eight shafts was the most common, derived from Cistercian forms. Wells Cathedral has some of the most complex columns, with eight groups of three shafts round the cruciform core of each pier. Clusters of three shafts, where one would be expected, characterised Gothic architecture in the west of England, also being used at Glastonbury Abbey and St Mary's Church, Shrewsbury. Where shafts were fully detached, Purbeck marble was often used, as it was for the thinner shafts supporting blind arcading and the like. At Salisbury, daringly slim single Purbeck shafts were used to carry some parts of the Trinity Chapel vault. This use of coloured marbles was seen at Canterbury by 1181 at the latest, and was derived from developments in and around Tournai, and ultimately from Roman precedent. Lesser churches generally had simpler round or octagonal columns.

=== Vaults and roofs ===
The standard vault was the quadripartite rib vault. In England the thin stones of the webbing were cut to meet in a saw-tooth pattern at the ridge. This seems to have been considered unsatisfactory, so a ridge rib was added to mask the joint. Additional, purely ornamental, ribs could be added to meet this ridge rib, forming a tierceron vault. This appears to have first been done in the 'crazy vaults' at Lincoln in the 1190s. The most notable Early English tierceron vaults are over the nave of Lincoln and the presbytery of Ely. Timber roofs were generally single-framed (i.e. all rafters were of equal thickness), and of collar-beam or scissor-braced form. The 13th century painted timber nave ceiling remains at Peterborough, a unique survival in England.

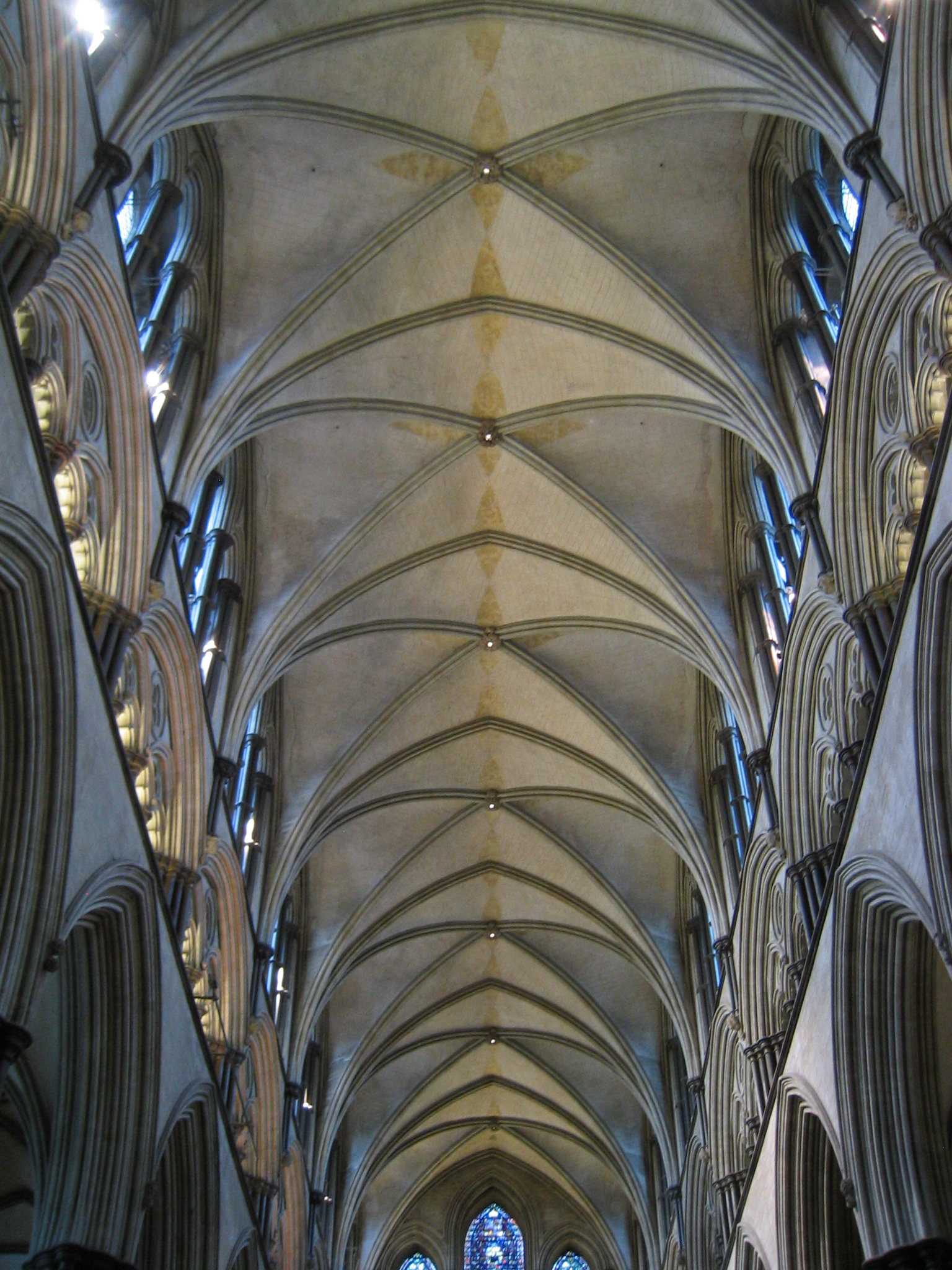
Quadripartite vaults at Salisbury

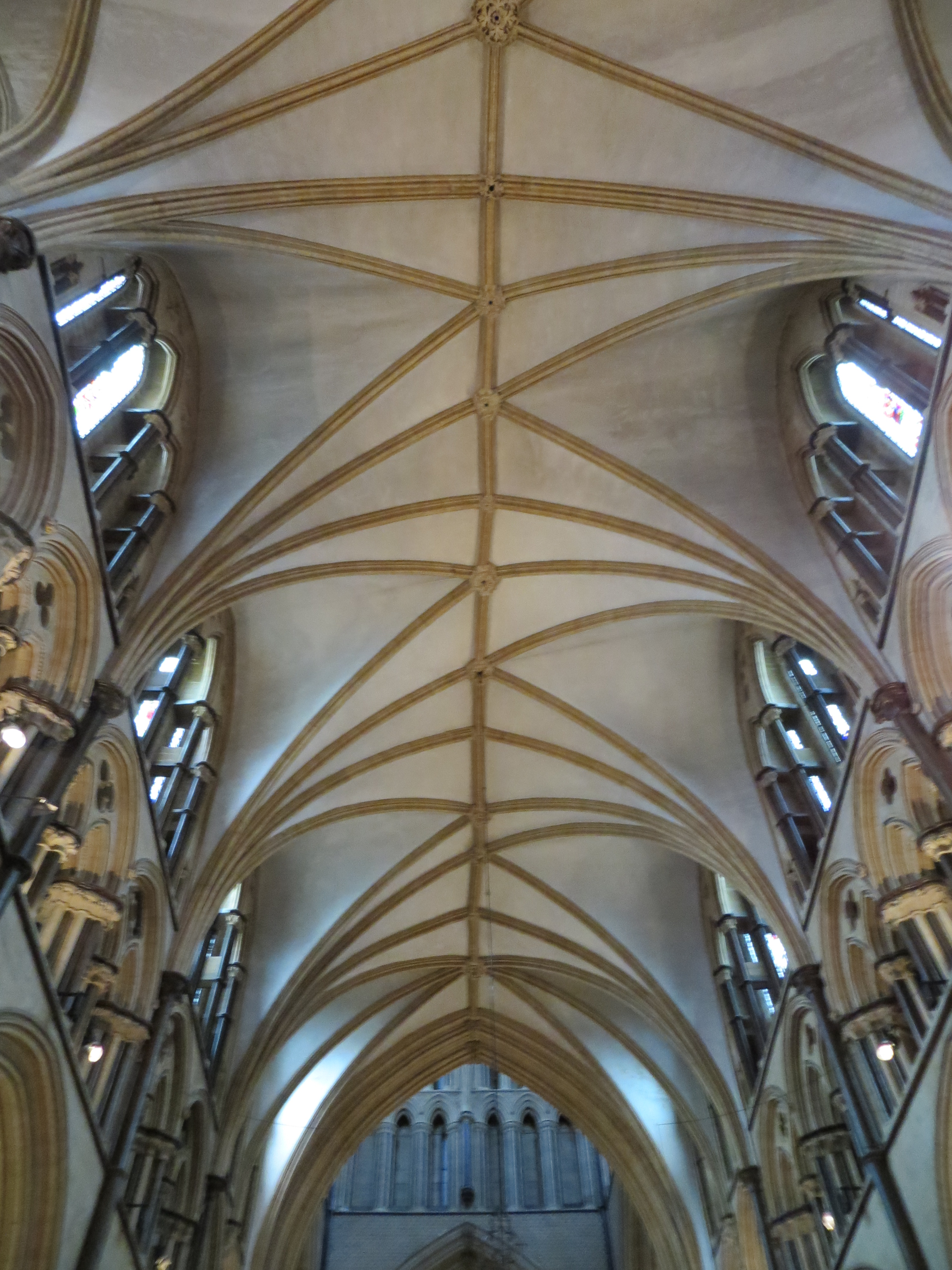
The 'crazy vault' over St Hugh's Choir at Lincoln

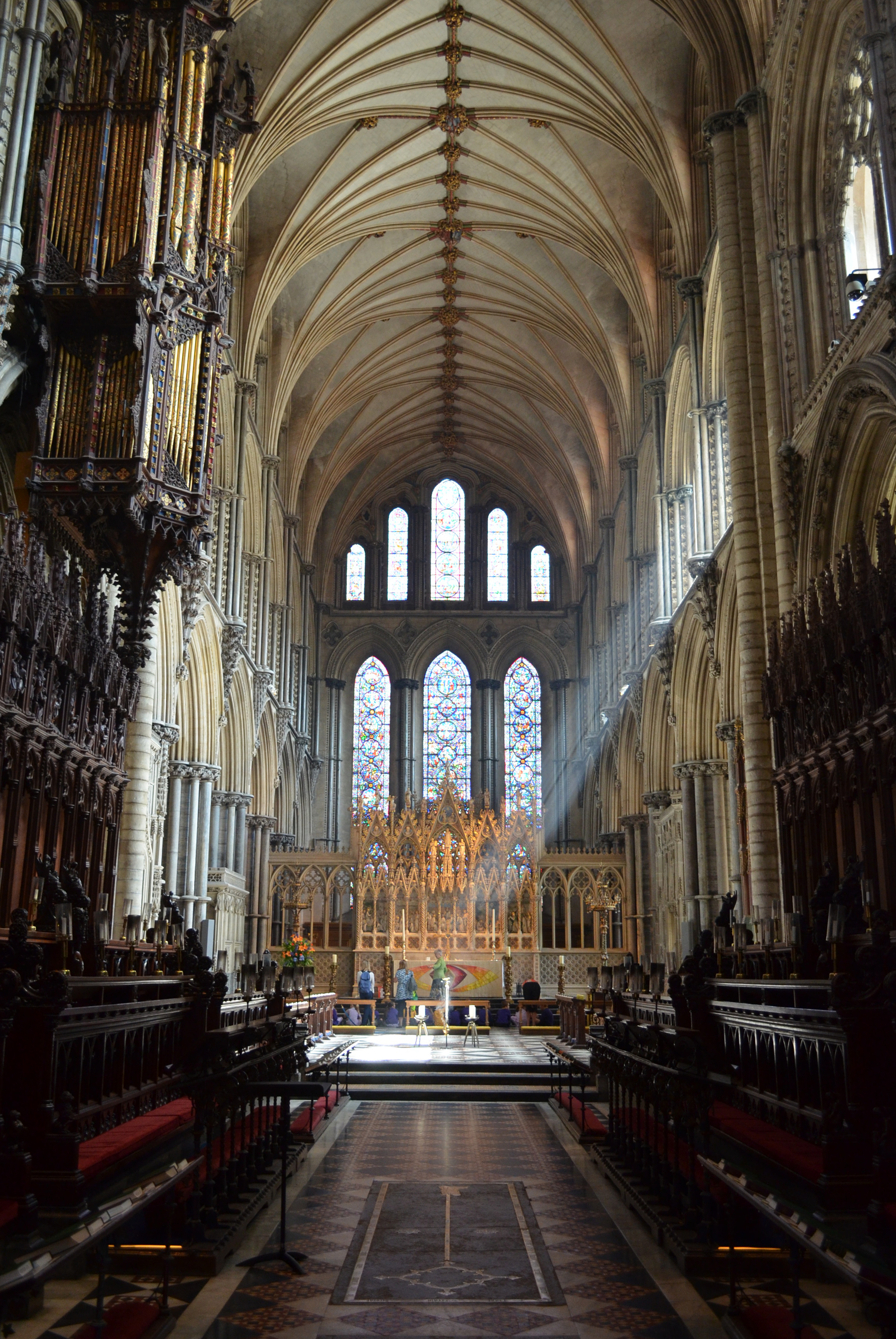
Tierceron vaults over the presbytery of Ely Cathedral

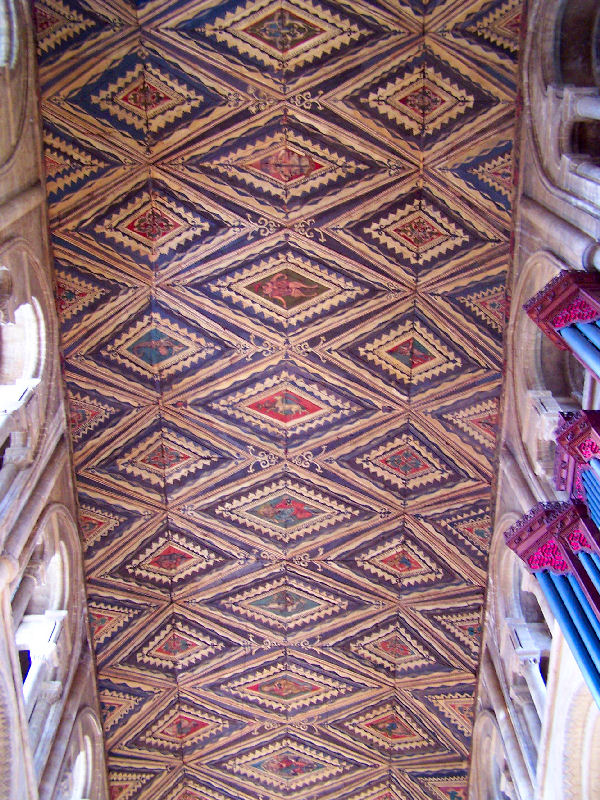
Timber ceiling at Peterborough

The much-restored roof above the vaults of Lincoln.

=== Façades ===
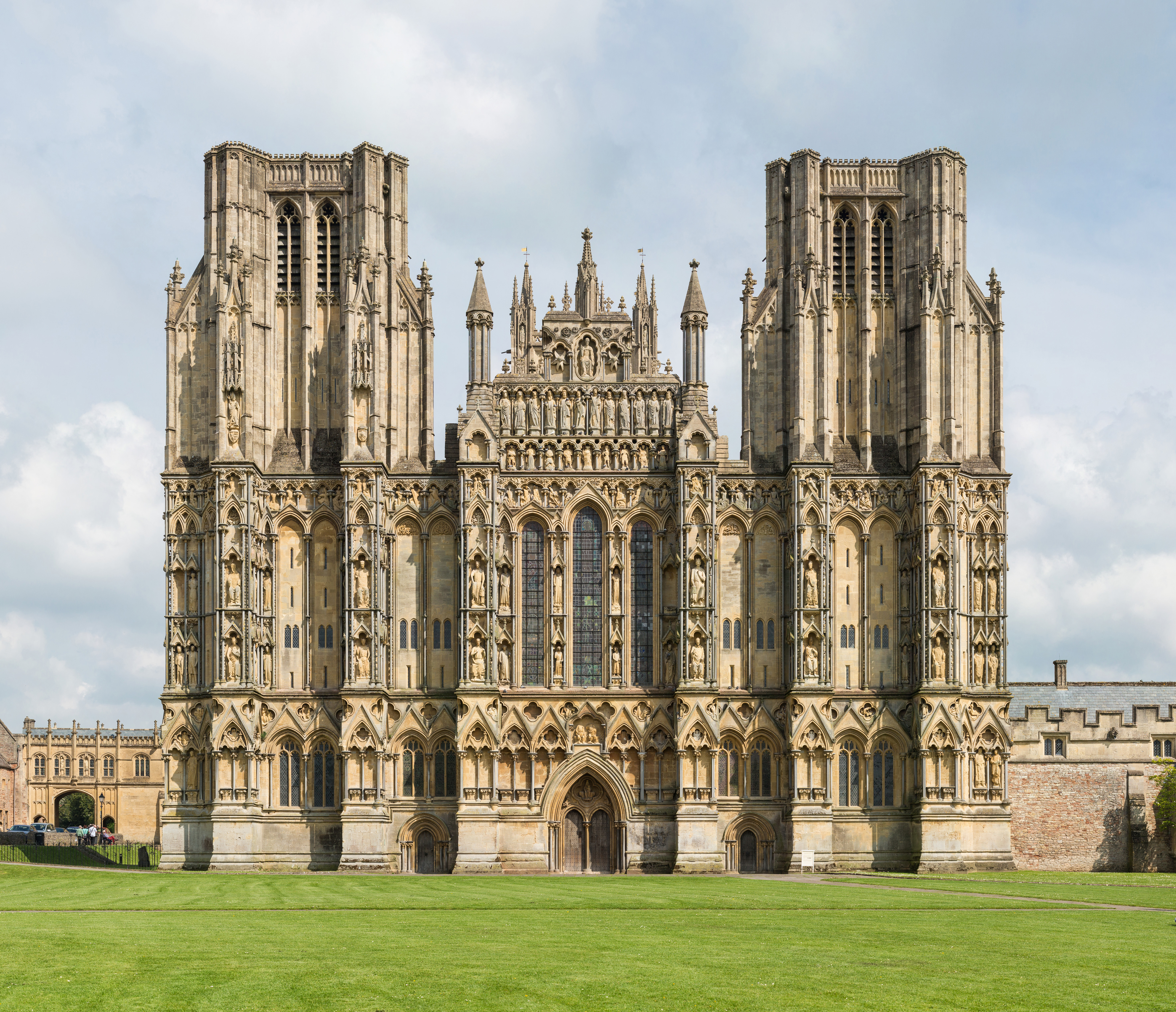
The west front of Wells Cathedral (the towers are later)

Unlike in France, the English did not fill façades with large rose windows, instead using groupings of lancets. The west fronts of cathedrals generally had two flanking towers, as at Wells and Ripon. English cathedrals were characterised by the flat screen front, wider than the church behind, and covered by rows of arcaded niches to house statuary. This is in contrast to French Gothic, where each part clearly corresponds to the building behind, and sculpture is concentrated on the doors. Wells, Peterborough and Lincoln have very wide screen fronts.

Several façades, including those of Wells and Salisbury, have internal passages with concealed openings behind the statues. These were probably used as galleries for the choir and musicians on Palm Sunday, when the notes of the Gloria would appear to come from the carved saints and angels.

=== Towers and spires ===
In this period, church towers were always topped with spires, usually of timber covered with lead. Spires were usually of broach form, as survive at North Rauceby and Raunds. Towers were decorated with superimposed tiers of blind arcading, usually with paired lancet windows to the bell stage. Occasionally parish church towers were separate from the main building so they would not collapse on to it, as at Long Sutton and West Walton.

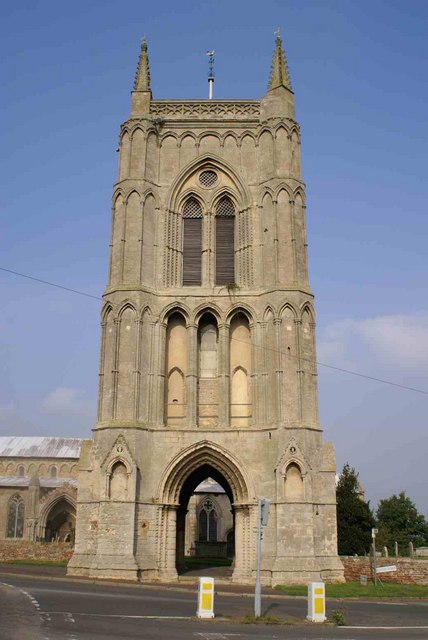
Detached belfry at St Mary's, West Walton

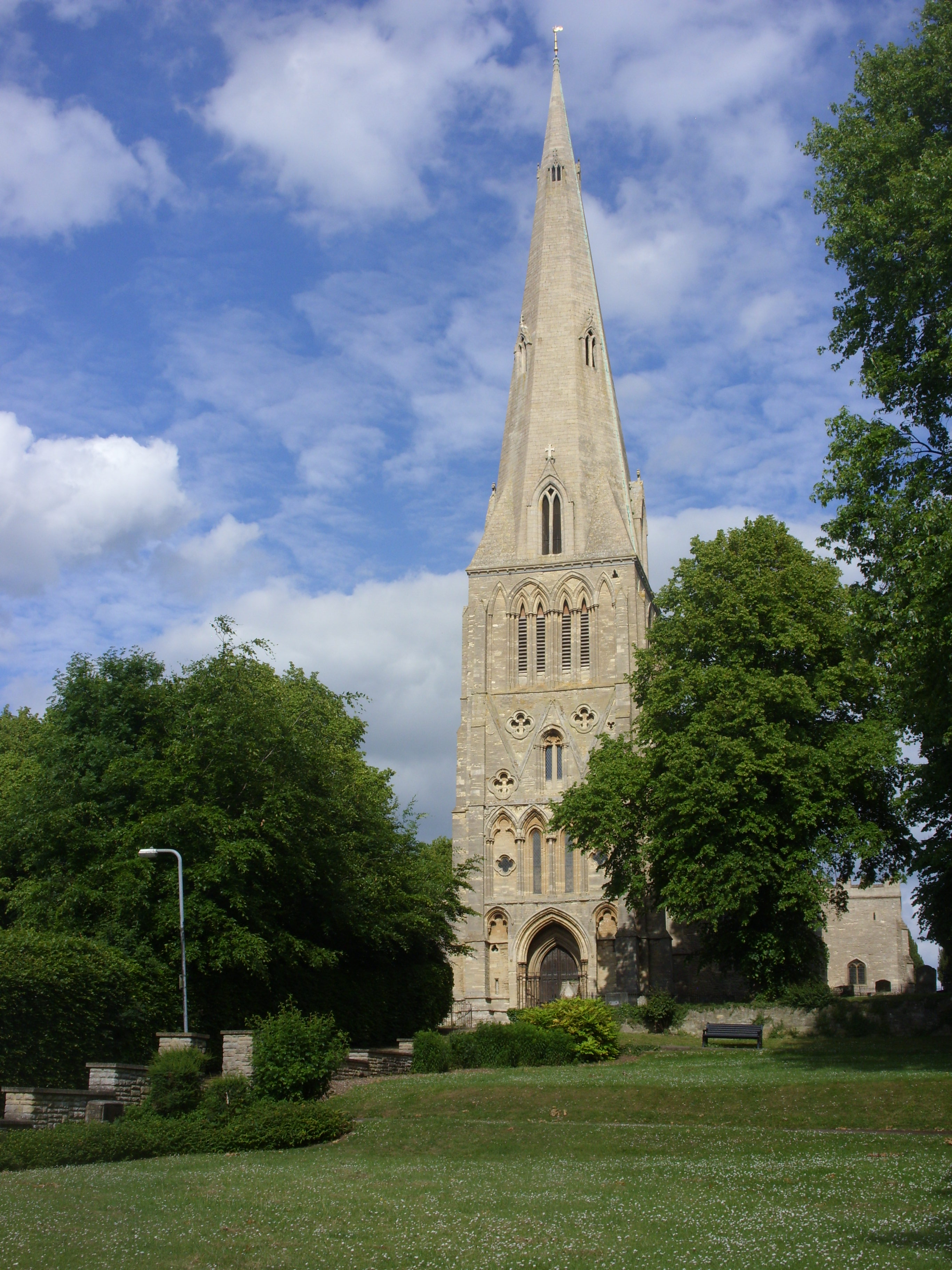
Broach spire at St Peter's, Raunds

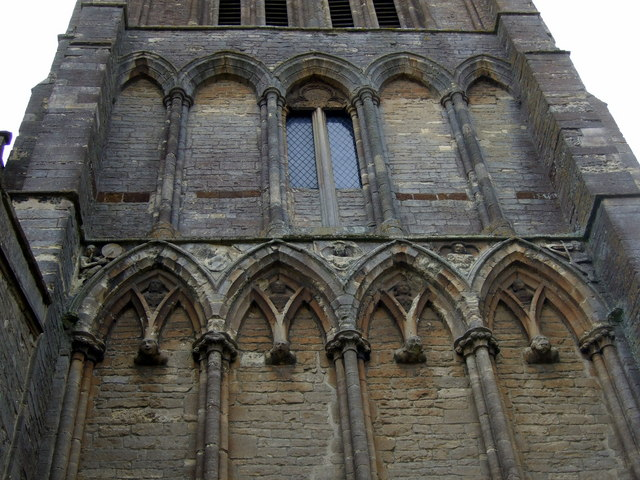
Arcaded tower decoration at Raunds

=== Carving and sculpture ===
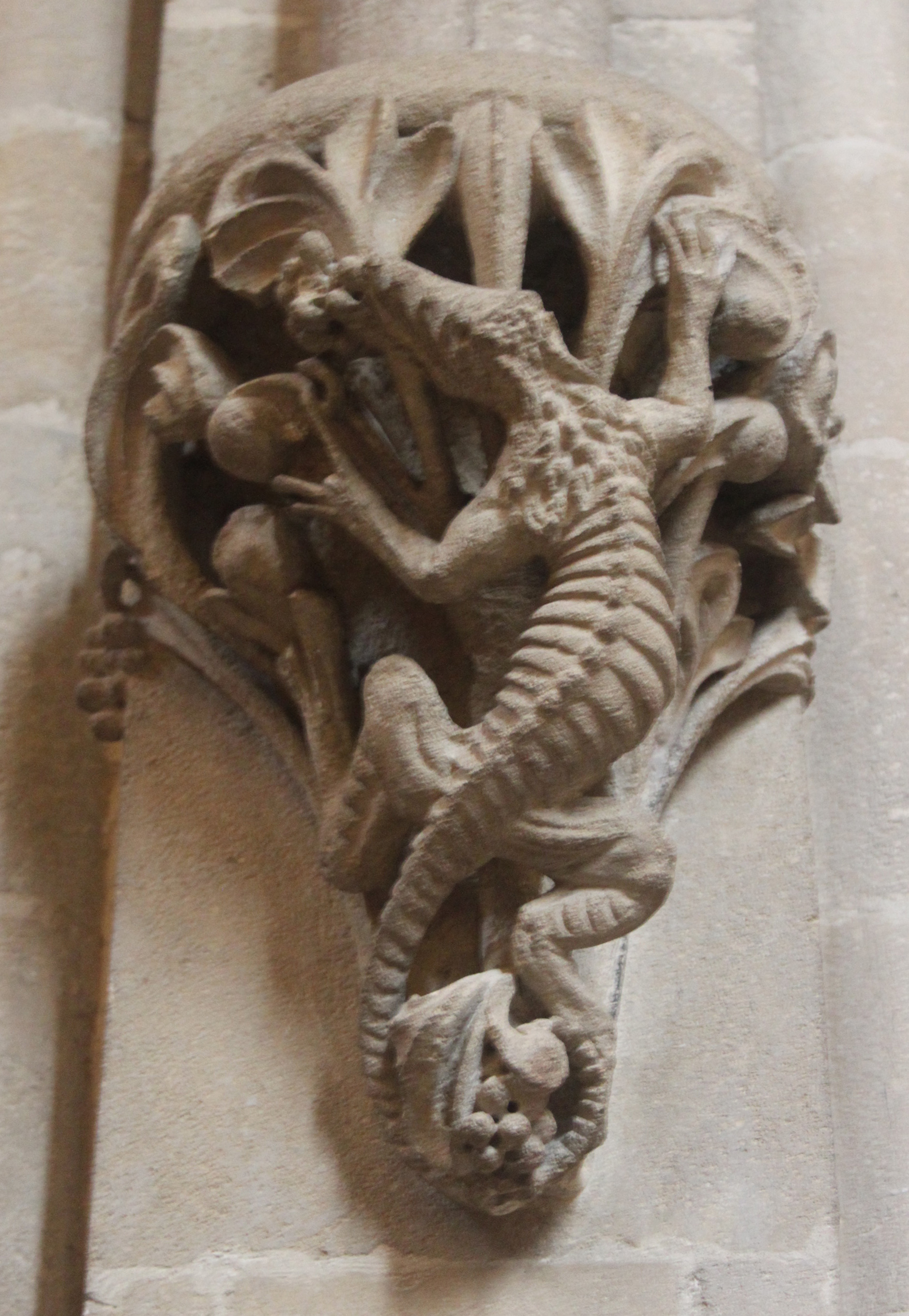
Inhabited stiff leaf corbel at Wells Cathedral

Little major figure sculpture has survived from this period, except for the tiers of stiff, erect Biblical figures on the west front of Wells. Water-leaf capitals were characteristic of early, Cistercian-influenced work, but the most elaborate churches used stiff-leaf, a type of abstract foliage. At Wells this was inhabited by narrative scenes, figures and animals, while in some later buildings it swayed to appear windblown. Stiff-leaf could evenly cover the capital or could be concentrated in crockets at the corners, a feature more normal in France. Where funds did not allow for sculpture or more austerity was aesthetically desired, as at Salisbury, capitals could be simply moulded. Square abaci over capitals are generally a sign of early date, but were still used at Kirkwall around the 1240s or '50s. Later abaci were generally rounded, with early examples in William the Englishman's eastern crypt at Canterbury Bases were often 'waterholding', with deep hollows and rolls. Arches were decorated with mouldings, small repeated pyramids called nailhead, or pyramidal four-petalled flowers called dog-tooth. Nailhead generally signifies earlier work, though dog-tooth can be seen as early as the 1170s on the vaults of Canterbury Cathedral.

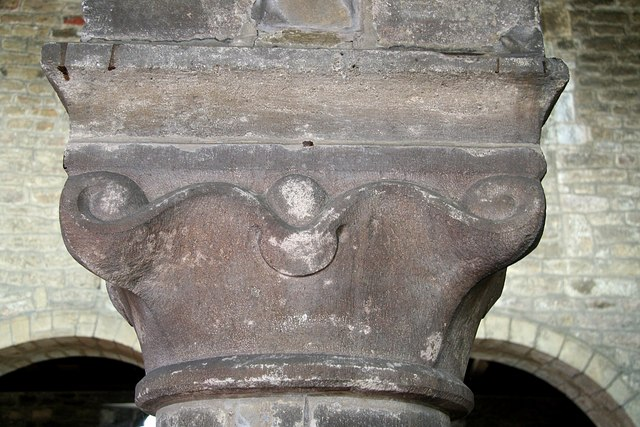
A water-leaf capital

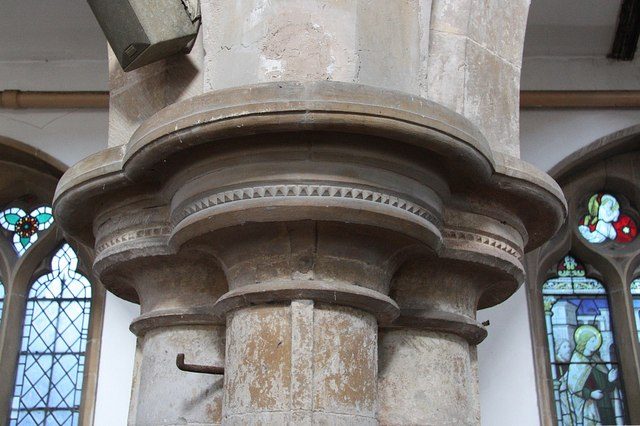
A bell capital, ornamented with nailhead. The central shaft has a fillet (applied flat strip)

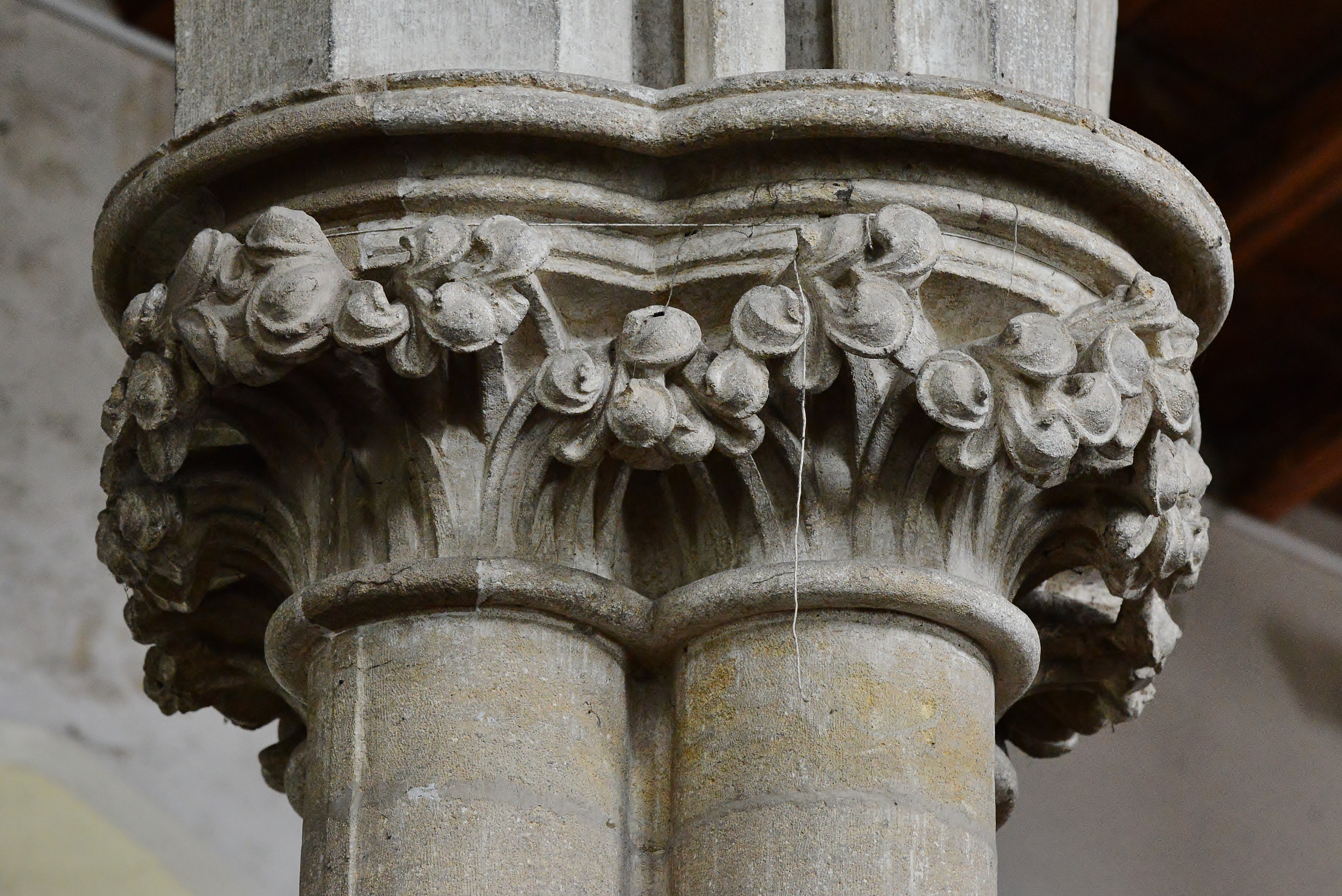
A stiff-leaf capital at Northwold.

Sedilia with dog-tooth at Holy Trinity Church, Wensley

=== Domestic architecture ===
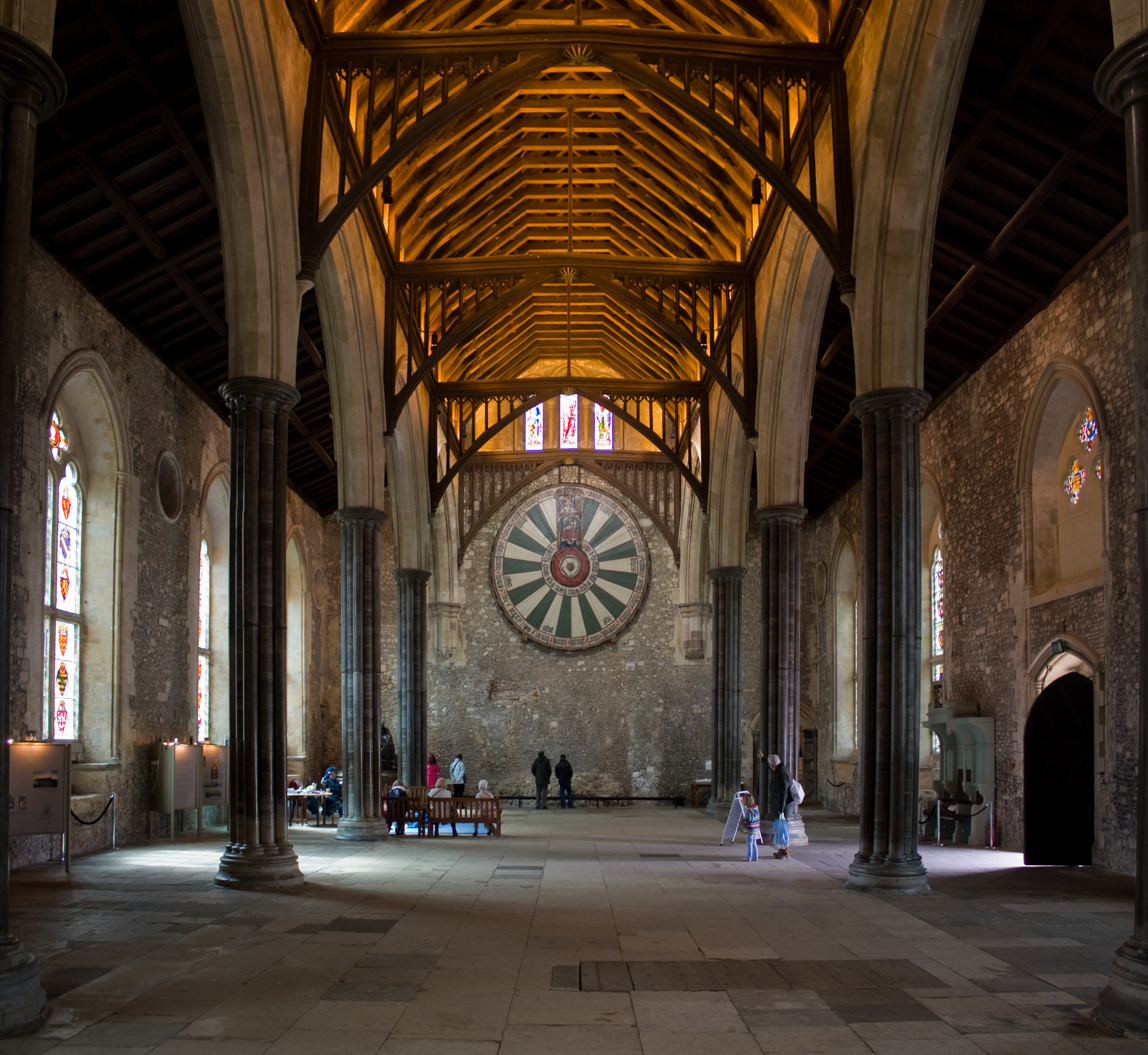
The great hall of Winchester Castle

Some domestic architecture has survived from this period. This largely consists of greater houses, such as bishops' palaces and the domestic buildings within castles, as they were more likely to be built of stone. They also more closely followed architectural fashions, such that common details can be seen between the cathedral of Lincoln and the contemporary bishop's palace next door. Similarly, the influence of Canterbury is as clear in castles, like Oakham and Dover, as it is in churches. Houses were centred on a great hall, which at this time was often aisled in wood or stone, as roofing technology had not yet developed to allow wide aisleless spans. The arcades of these aisles followed the pattern of church architecture, with Purbeck marble being used at Winchester, and waterleaf capitals at Auckland. Windows were also simpler versions of those used in churches, generally of two lights, with the difference that often only the upper part was glazed (if at all), with the lower part having opening shutters. These two registers were divided by a transom, as at Winchester Castle, a feature that would become significant in Perpendicular Gothic architecture. Window seats may also have been a late 12th century development. Houses condensed from a collection of separate buildings grouped round the hall to a single block containing the hall, chamber and services (though the kitchen was still separate as a fire precaution).

=== Military architecture ===
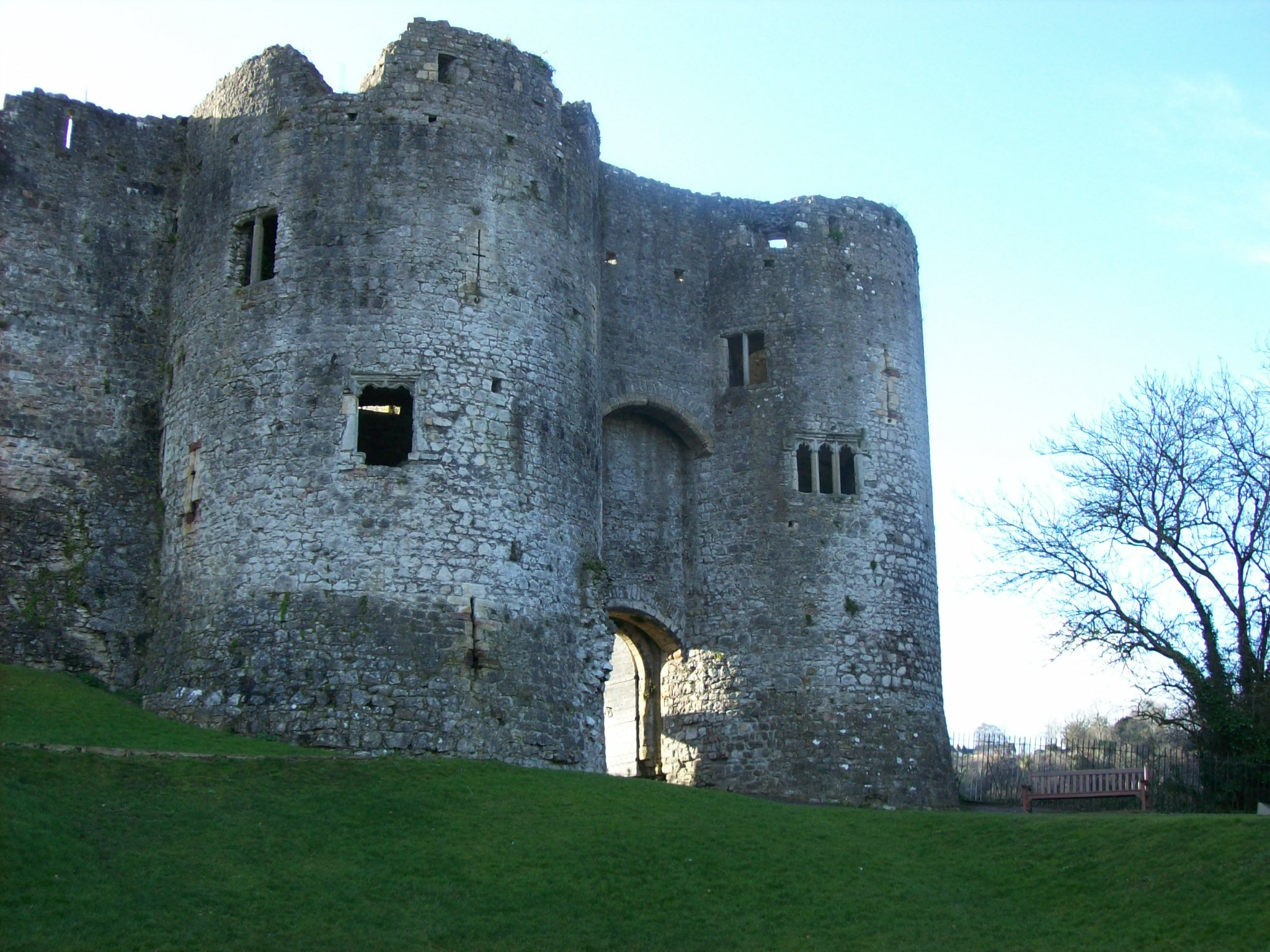
The late 12th century gatehouse at Chepstow Castle

Castle design of this period was characterised by two changes: the replacement of square towers with round ones (which may have better resisted bombardment and undermining), and the replacement of the central keep with an encircling stone curtain wall. These two developments could happen separately, with Conisbrough Castle having a round keep and round towers, while Framlingham has no keep but square towers. These changes were influenced by similar developments in France under Philip Augustus, and potentially by the castles of the Crusades. William Marshal appears to have been influential in introducing these new features after he married the heiress of Pembroke in 1189, building a great round tower at Pembroke, a quadrangle with round corner towers at Kilkenny and a gatehouse with twin round towers at Chepstow. Regularly-planned castles with round towers were used by King John at Limerick and Dublin to reinforce English rule in Ireland. They were inspired by Philip Augustus's use of similar castles to cement Capetian power in France, and were more regular in plan than castles in England, partly due to their being built on fresh sites.

== Examples ==
=== Beverley Minster ===
Now a vast parish church, but formerly an outpost of the Archbishops of York, along with Southwell and Ripon. The nave and twin west towers are later medieval (designed to harmonise with the earlier work), but the east end, with two pairs of transepts, is in the grandest Early English manner, three-storeyed and fully vaulted.

=== Canterbury Cathedral ===
The east end was rebuilt after a fire in 1174 by William of Sens and William the Englishman, adapting French Gothic forms to English tastes and the constraints of the existing building. The general forms are French, taking inspiration from several buildings, but some of the details, such as the Purbeck marble shafting and rounded abaci, are more common to England. The odd plan, narrowing and then widening before finishing in a chevet with a single axial chapel-tower, resulted from the needs to retain two chapel-towers from the earlier building, while also providing a shrine for the remains of St Thomas Becket, murdered in the cathedral in 1170. William of Sens' work has alternating round and octagonal columns to the main arcade and paired round arches in the low gallery (the design of which was subject to several changes of plan), while the Englishman's work has more varied piers and a more Gothic triforium. The use of coloured marble columns may have represented Becket's spilt blood and brains, as well as alluding to ancient Rome. The reconstruction took ten years, though decoration dragged on until 1220. The building retains much of its original stained glass.

=== Dunblane Cathedral ===
Unusually for a cathedral, the building (c.1230s-1270s) lacks transepts, vaults and triforium, appearing more like a large parish church save for the high quality of the design. The elongated aisleless choir was also used at Dunkeld and Fortrose. The nave has high arcades and unvaulted aisles, suggesting that a three-storeyed design was begun and soon abandoned. The clerestory shows the transition from plate to bar tracery, while the choir with its vast (twice replaced) bar-traceried windows more properly belongs to Geometrical Decorated.

=== Elgin Cathedral ===
The see was transferred from Spynie in 1224, and the heavily-ruined cathedral shows two phases of 13th century construction (much altered after the cathedral was torched by the Wolf of Badenoch in 1390). The south transept and western towers belong to the first phase, still with some round arches. The rich two-storeyed east end is of the second phase, after a fire in 1270. The eastern two bays project beyond the aisles, allowing greater light. The east wall has two tiers of five lancets, with a large rose in the gable, enabled (as at York) by the lack of vaulting. The lancets had some bar tracery insets, suggesting awareness of recent fashions, though the general lines were derived from Southwell.

=== Ely Cathedral ===
Pointed and trefoil arches began to appear at the Transitional west end of the Norman church, in the blind arcading of the western transept and the great arches under the west tower. The (restored) west porch came next, with an unusually large and fine door and a triplet of lancets above. The side walls have deep syncopated blind arcading, with vaulting between the two layers of arcades, in a manner related to St Hugh's Choir at Lincoln. Following this, attention turn to the outmoded Norman east end (now destroyed by the collapse of the tower in 1322). The old apse was removed and a new presbytery and feretory added, perhaps the most ornate major Early English building. The design is an elaboration of the nave at Lincoln, adapted to suit the existing Norman proportions. The east wall has a rare surviving cluster of lancets, not replaced by a larger late medieval window. The large stiff-leaf corbels burst into flower over the site of St Ethelreda's shrine, possibly representing a miracle in which her wooden staff was alleged to bloom into an ash tree.

=== Fountains Abbey ===
The long nave is Cistercian late Romanesque, with fat round piers and slightly pointed arches. Many of the monastic buildings, including the refectory and the extremely long cellarium, are Early English, as is the slightly later east end of the church. This had a luxurious choir (largely destroyed in the 18th century) and a hammer-headed Chapel of the Nine Altars, a feature also seen at Durham.

=== Glasgow Cathedral ===
The finest Early English work in Scotland, and one of the most inventive surviving in Britain. There was an abortive reconstruction in the 1180s or -90s, but the present cathedral was largely begun in the first third of the 13th century. Despite several changes of plan, the form is a simple rectangle, with non-projecting transepts in the French manner, and a straight retrochoir behind the high altar, while the elevations are elaborations on Rievaulx, though without the vault. However, the crypt is very complex, with the regular vaulting pattern being disrupted to create a 'canopy of honour' of four elaborated closely-spaced columns round St Kentigern's shrine, while further east the piers spread out to form a dome over the second focus of the Lady Chapel. The nave is more vertical, with narrower bays and an integrated gallery and clerestory responding to later 13th century Rayonnant developments in France and England. The two west towers were demolished in the 19th century.

=== Hexham Priory ===
Reconstruction of the Saxon and Norman monastery had reached the east end of the nave when it was halted by the Scottish wars, not to be completed until the 20th century. The gallery arches are still round, with pointed sub-arches. The north transept has astonishingly tall and thin lancets in the end wall, while the south transept contains the canons' night stair.

=== Lincoln Cathedral ===
The largest of the Early English cathedrals, with rebuilding starting in 1192. Some unorthodox, even wilful forms are used, such as the 'crazy vaults' over the choir and the syncopated blind arcading in the aisles. The unusual polygonal chevet was replaced by the Angel Choir (1256–80). There are sexpartite vaults to the transepts, but a tierceron vault over the nave, giving a rich and much-copied effect. There are more unusual vaults in the west transept. The north rose window still has medieval glass. The aisles have two external bays to every one internal bay, an idea that was occasionally used elsewhere. The west front is built around the surviving Norman core, and is a very large and flat screen, now lacking statuary. Many of the original timber roofs survive. The ruined bishop's palace and decagonal chapter house are contemporary.

=== Pembroke Castle ===
William Marshal rebuilt the castle, adding an influential round great tower that challenges the idea that the keep was obsolete in this period. The tower is roofed by a dome and had three tiers of fighting platforms at the top, akin to the 14th century tower at Fort La Latte in Brittany. The restored outer walls and town wall were completed by the Marshal's successors later in the 13th century, with more round towers and a gatehouse with barbican.

=== Peterborough Cathedral ===
The cathedral (only an abbey until the Reformation) is almost entirely Norman (work on the nave continued in the same style into the 13th century to ensure uniformity), but the west front of c.1200 is an abrupt contrast. It forms a giant portico, with turrets flanking three great arches topped with gables, and a high vaulted space behind. Behind the portico are western transepts and two towers, only one of which was completed. The doors are small and oddly placed, as the shape of the front does not reflect the building behind. The centre subtly bulges outwards and leans forwards, to create an optical illusion of greater size.

=== Rievaulx Abbey ===
The destroyed nave was an early example of the Burgundian Cistercian style, with plain square piers and pointed barrel vaults. The east end of the church was rebuilt in the 1220s as a scaled-down version of Lincoln, with elegant paired triforium arches, six east lancets and a vault. The refectory is also a fine example of Early English work. As it had many daughter houses in Scotland, Rievaulx's new east end proved influential, though it bankrupted the abbey.

=== Salisbury Cathedral ===
The archetypal Early English cathedral, built (with the exception of the tower, chapter house and cloisters) in one campaign (1220–58). The construction was organised by Elias of Dereham, a canon and clerk at the cathedral, who may also have been its designer (though this is greatly disputed). The plan has long double transepts, and an echelon of chapels behind the high altar, every one right angled. The church lacks carved capitals, or even any dog-tooth moulding, the only (replaced) statuary being on the west front. The vaulting shafts do not extend below the gallery, leaving a strong straight line between it and the arcades. The design evokes both Canterbury (in the very slim Purbeck shafts carrying the Trinity Chapel vault) and Lincoln (in the double transepts), but is more precisely set out and more rigorously detailed than either of those buildings. The simplicity of the architecture would have been tempered by the richness of the stained glass (mostly destroyed by Wyatt), the furnishings (again mostly removed, though part of the pulpitum survives re-erected) and the mural paintings (repainted by the Victorians, but surviving faintly on the eastern transept vaults).

=== The Tower of London ===
The 11th century White Tower of William the Conqueror was gradually encircled by a series of stone walls in the 13th century. Richard I began works with the octagonal Bell Tower. Henry III built the Inmost Ward and domestic buildings (now mostly destroyed) and much of the Inner Ward, including the large round Wakefield Tower. He also built a new gate in around 1238 which, while it immediately collapsed, appears to have been influential. Edward I replaced the ruined gate with the brick Beauchamp Tower and added the narrow Outer Ward to make the Tower the first true concentric castle (in which the soldiers on the inner wall could fire over the heads of those on the outer wall) in England.

=== Wells Cathedral ===
One of the earliest Early English works, without the French features seen at Canterbury. The east end was replaced in the 14th century. The building is low, with quadripartite vaults throughout. In the transepts, the vaulting shafts divide the triforium, but in the nave it runs straight from west front to crossing. The columns are complex, with 24 limestone shafts around a cruciform, and the inhabited stiff-leaf capitals are very fine, especially in the transepts. The west front is a broad screen, with the towers projecting beyond the aisles, and about half its original statuary.

=== Winchester Castle ===
The great hall is the only building to survive from this important royal castle. It was built by Henry III in 1222-36 and is aisled, with arcades of Purbeck marble. The outer walls formerly rose to gablets over the plate traceried windows; the roof is a later reconstruction.

=== York Minster ===
Archbishop Roger's 1160s rebuilding of the Norman east end has vanished, but was likely of Cistercian Transitional form. Rebuilding then moved to the surviving transepts. They are very high, with timber ceilings (that to the south destroyed by lightning in 1984) and round arches over the triforium. The south façade is very busy, with three gablets over the door and a rose (or 'marigold') window pushed up into the gable, while that to the north is an austere composition of five vast lancets, the Five Sisters Window, with original grisaille glass.

== Gallery ==
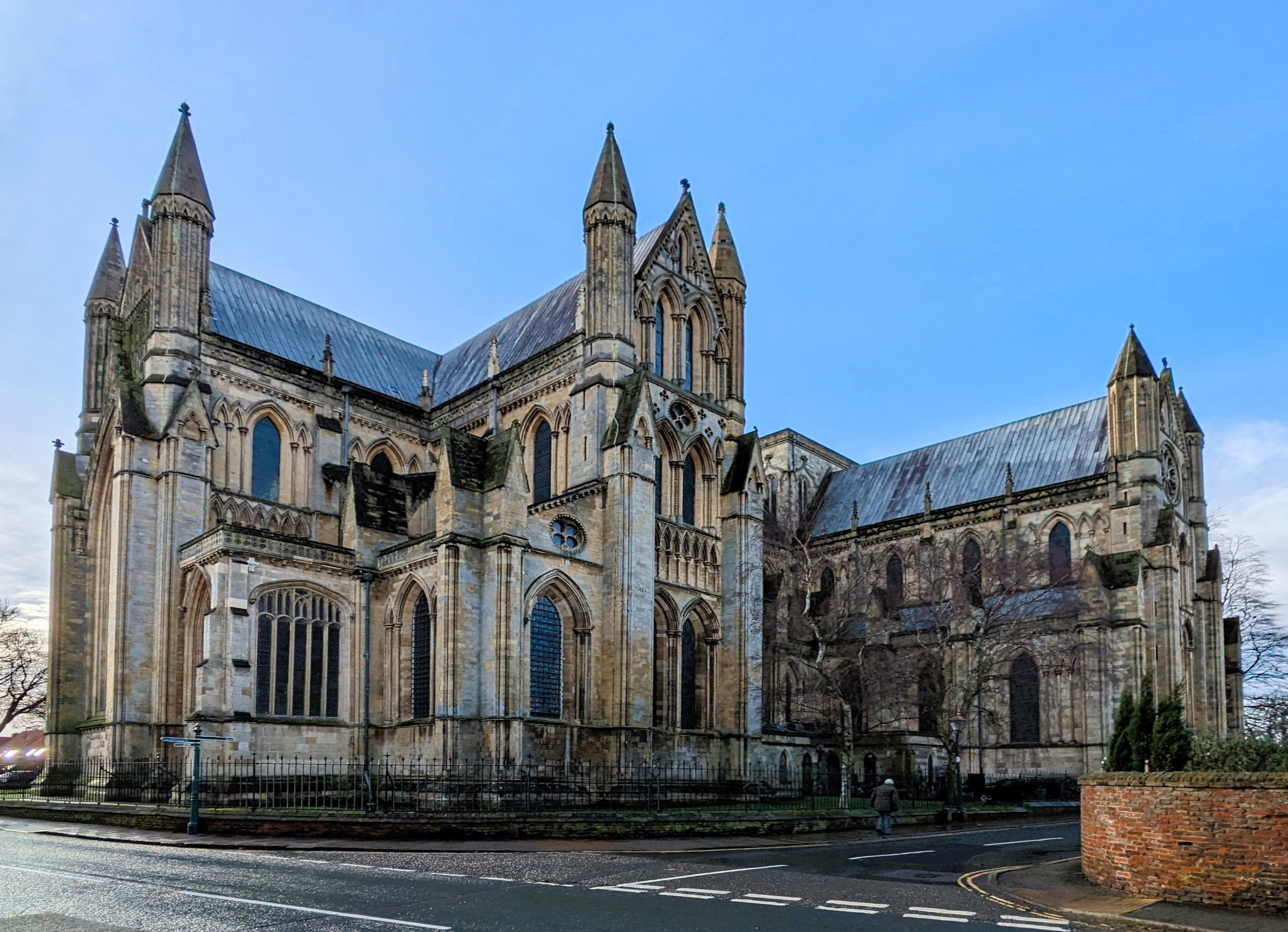
The east end of Beverley Minster, showing double transepts

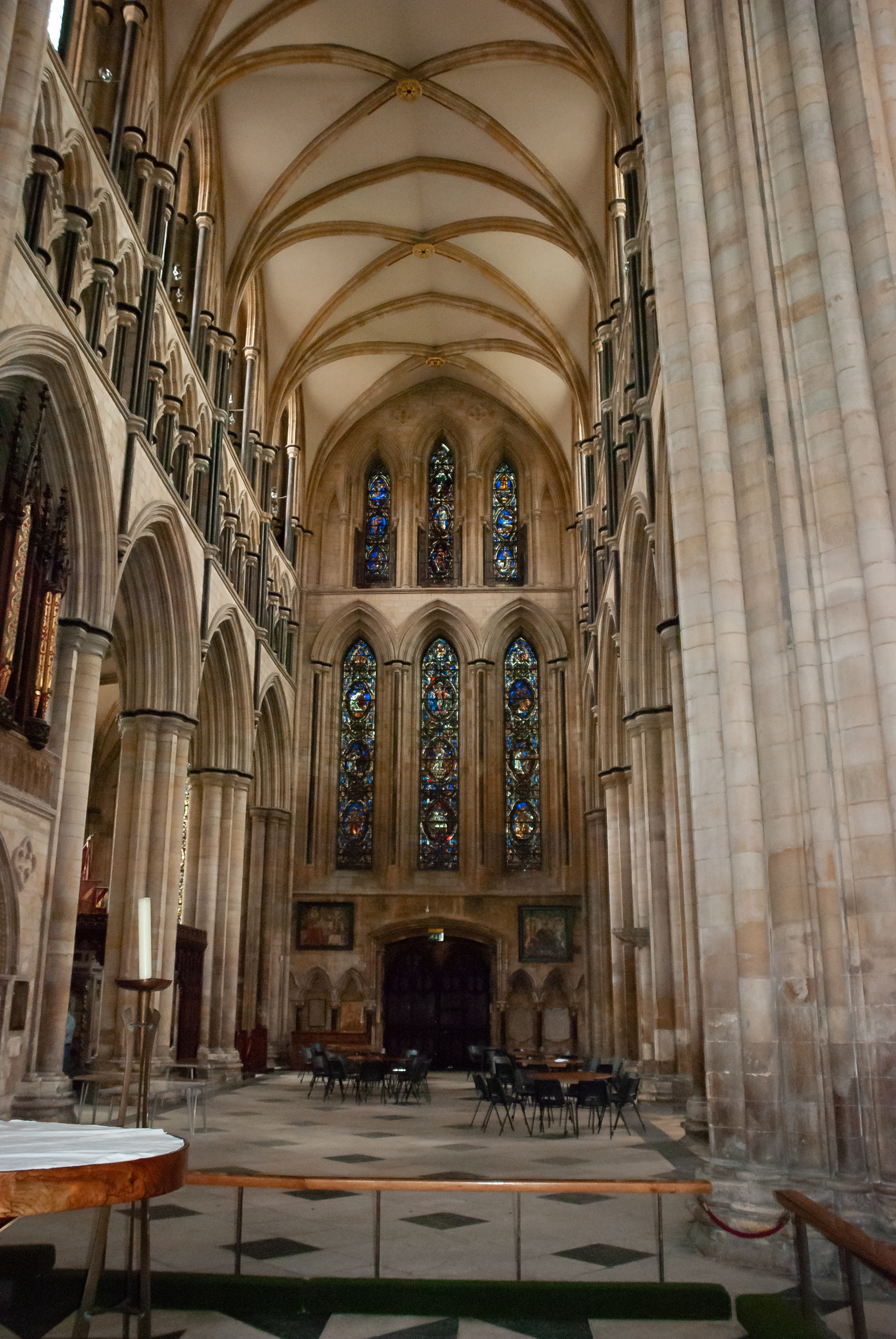
The transept of Beverley Minster

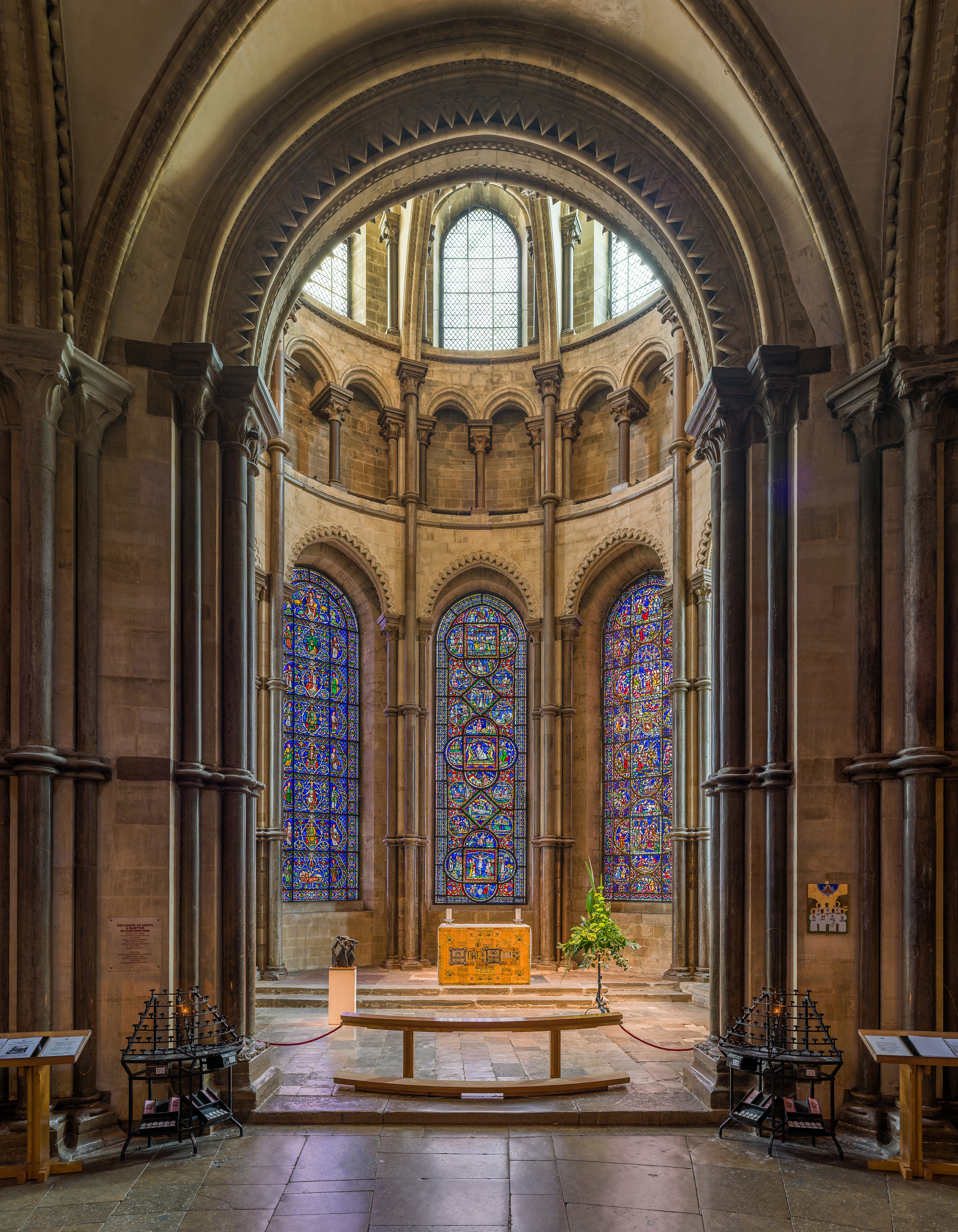
The Corona at Canterbury Cathedral, with late 12th century stained glass

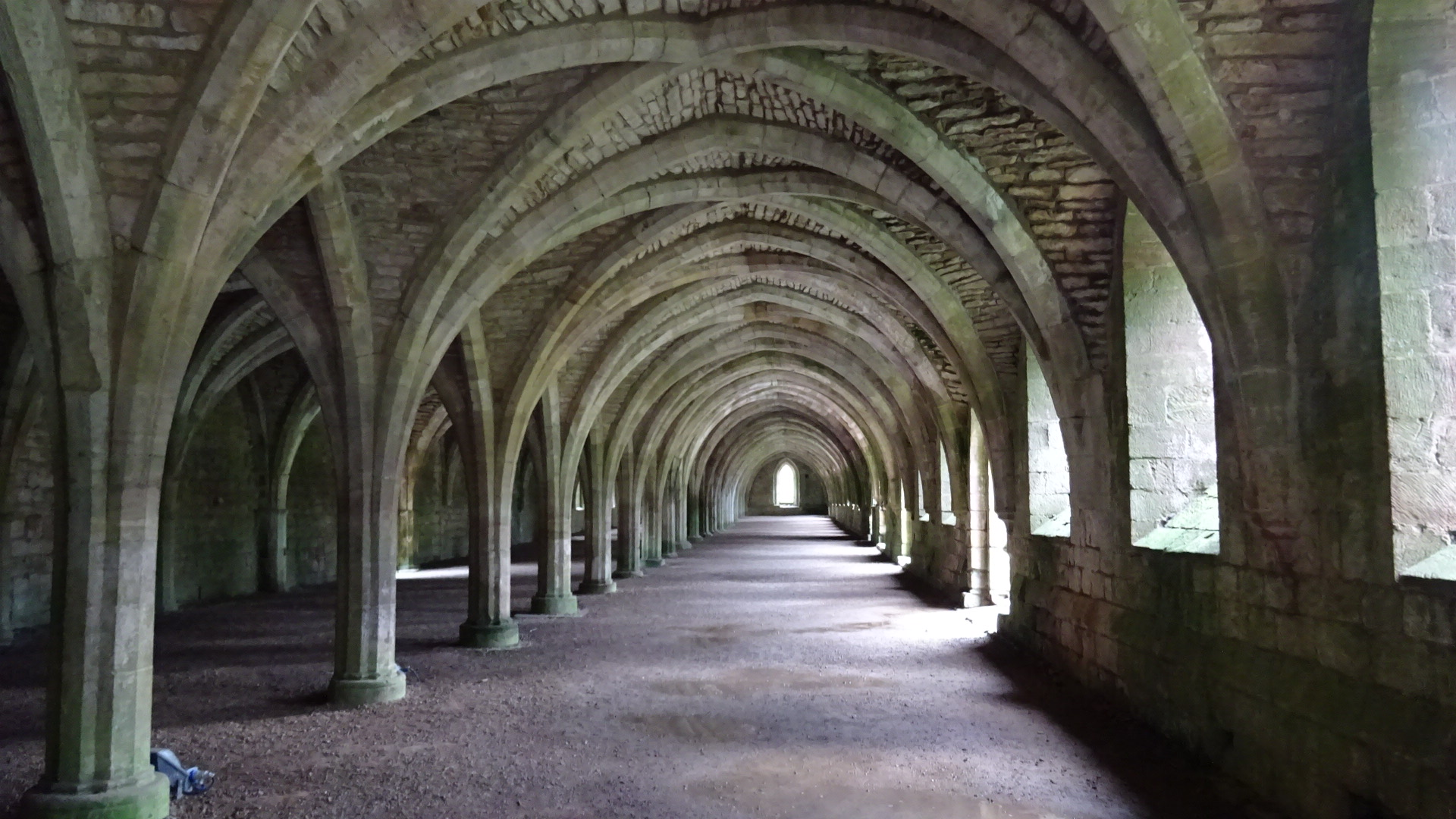
The cellarium at Fountains Abbey

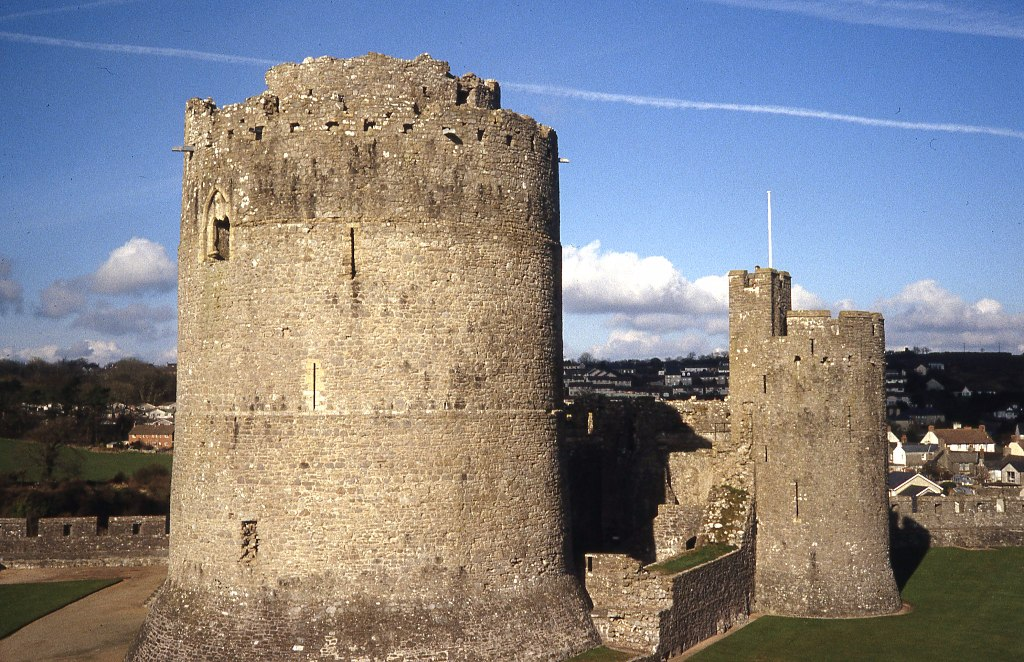
The Great Tower at Pembroke Castle

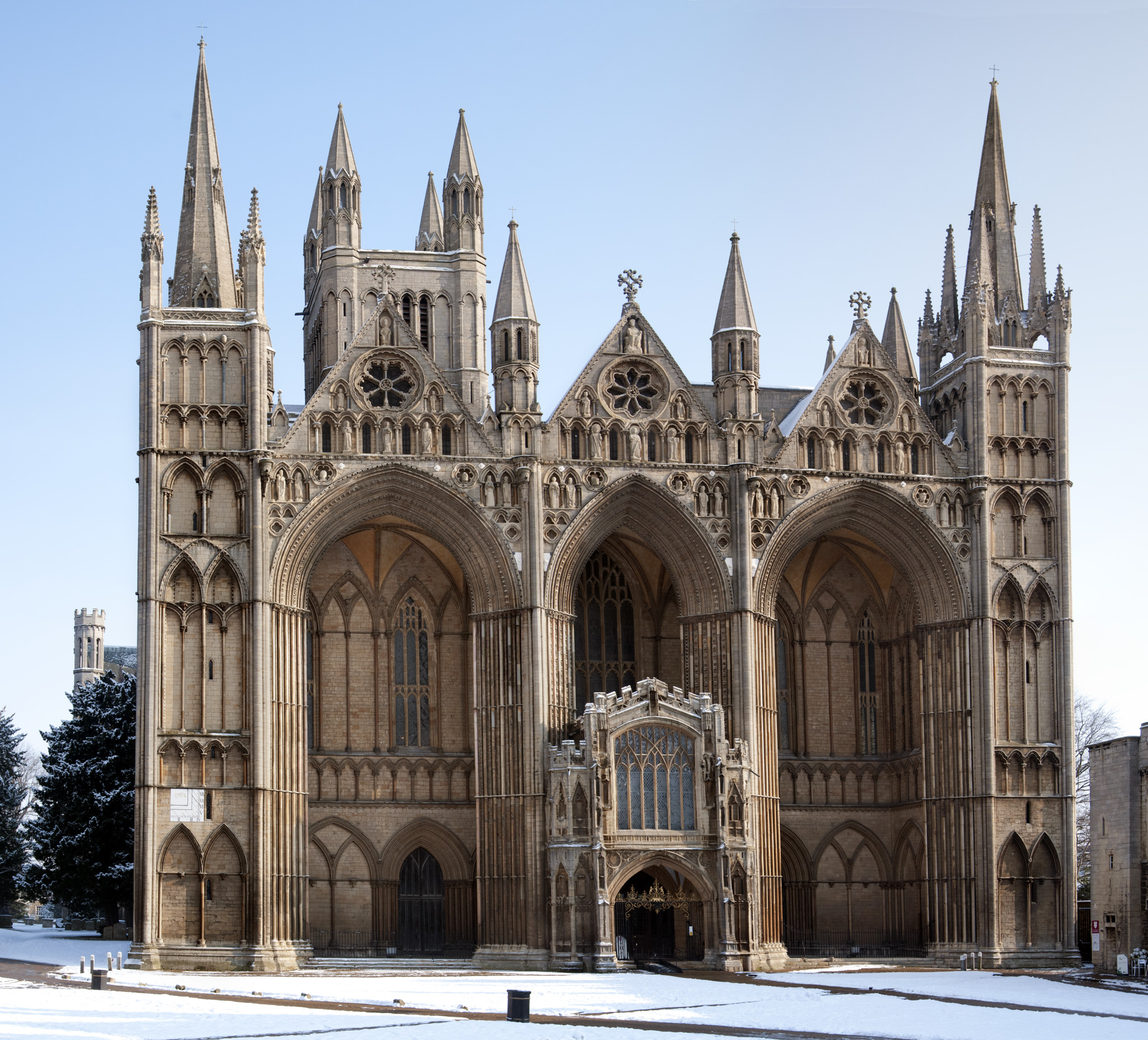
The west front of Peterborough Cathedral

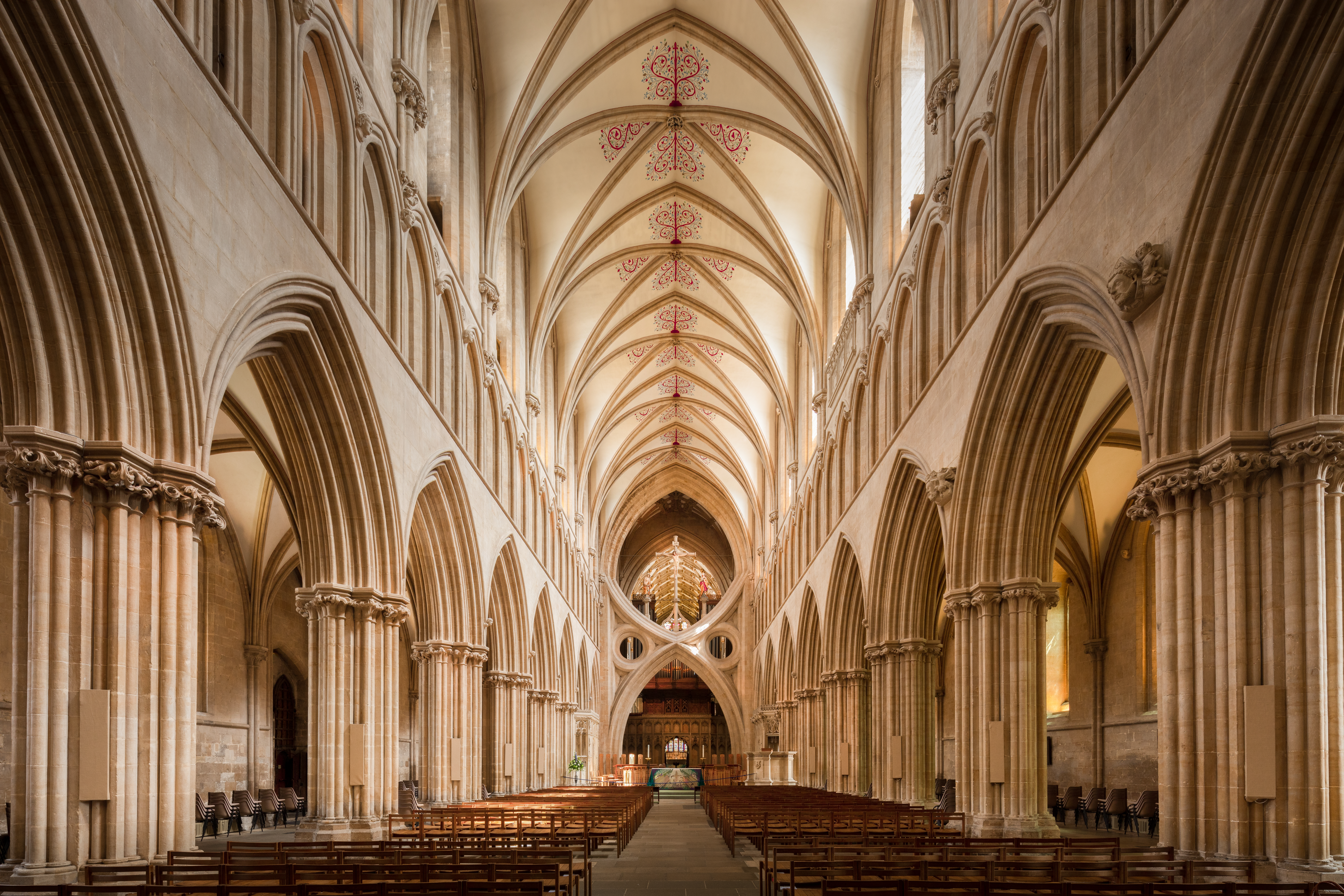
The nave of Wells Cathedral. The scissor arches at the far end are a 14th century insertion

== See also ==
- Architecture of the medieval cathedrals of England
- Classic Gothic
- Early Gothic architecture
- English Gothic architecture
- Gothic architecture
- High Gothic
