= Alexander the Mason =

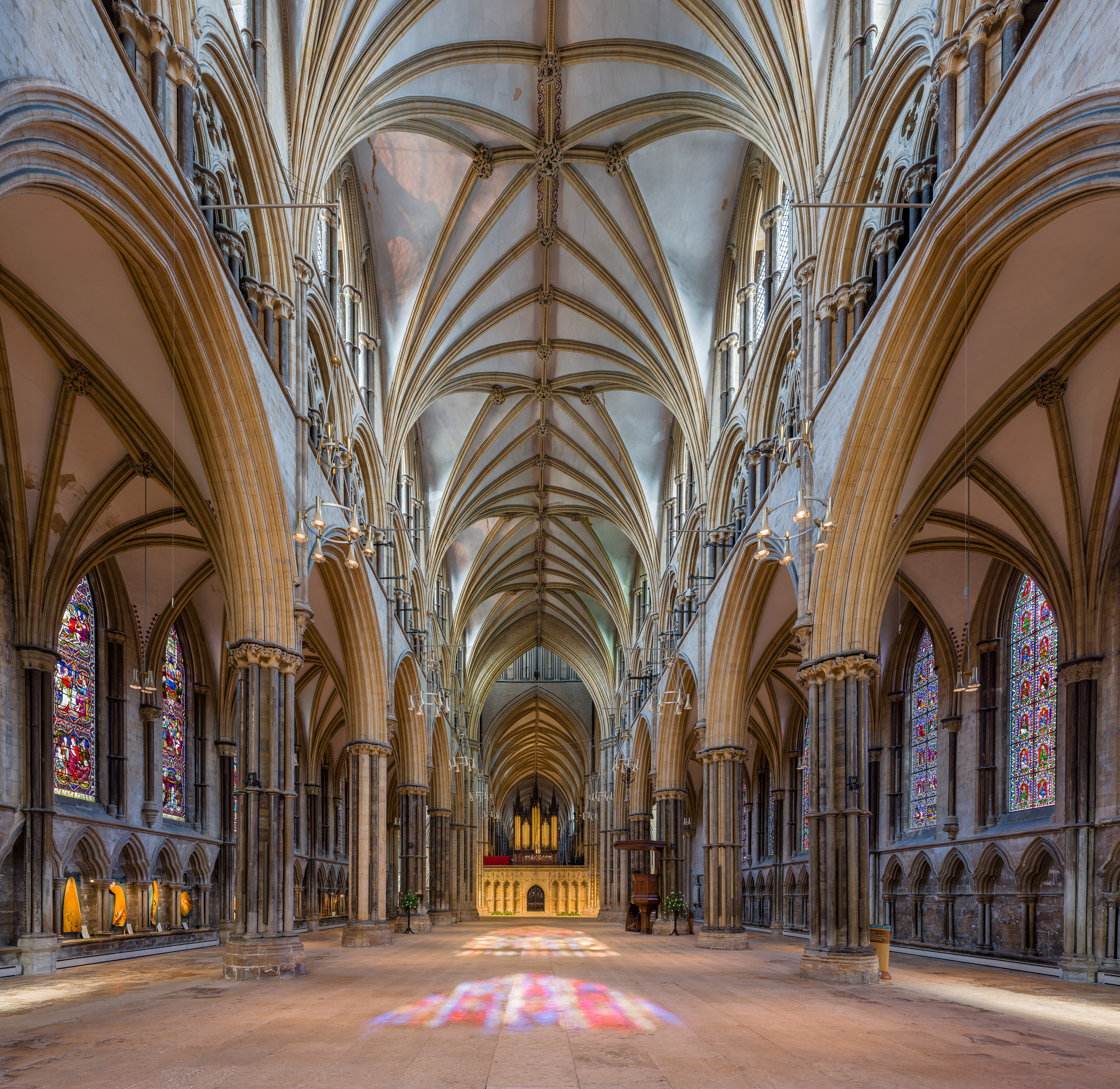
Nave and vaulting of Lincoln Cathedral

Alexander the Mason, sometimes called Alexander the Mason III, was a master mason who designed the nave and crossing of Lincoln Cathedral in the mid 13th century. Following Geoffrey de Noiers as designer, Alexander designed the star-patterned vaulting of the nave, adding tierceron ribs to decorate the vaulting, which had heretofore been relatively plain. The crossing vault, dating to 1238, was extensively elaborated, using eight spring points in the tower. Alexander designed the cathedral's screen front, chapter house and Galilee porch. The chapter house at Worcester Cathedral is also attributed to Alexander, and he may have worked in France at Le Mans Cathedral. Other churches in England attributed to Alexander are St Wulfram's Church, Grantham and St. Mary Magdalene, Newark-on-Trent.
