= Anna Davenport Raines =

Founding member of the United Daughters of the Confederacy

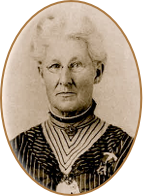

Vice President of the United Daughters of the Confederacy

Custodian of the Southern Cross of Honor

Honorary President General of the United Daughters of the Confederacy

Personal details
- Born: Anna Mitchell Davenport; April 8, 1853 Isle of Hope, Georgia, U.S.
- Died: January 21, 1915 (aged 61) Savannah, Georgia, U.S.
- Resting place: Laurel Grove Cemetery
- Spouse: Lucian Hamilton Raines
- Children: 5
- Parent(s): Hugh McCall Davenport; Martha Anne Elizabeth Stone
- Relatives: Isaiah Davenport (grandfather)
- Occupation: philanthropist
- Known for: Co-founding the United Daughters of the Confederacy

Anna Mitchell Davenport Raines (April 8, 1853 – January 21, 1915) was an American philanthropist and founding Vice President of the United Daughters of the Confederacy. She later served as the organization's Honorary President General and as the Custodian of the Southern Cross of Honor.

== Biography ==
=== Early years ===
Raines was born Anna Mitchell Davenport on April 8, 1853, in Isle of Hope, Georgia, near Savannah, to Major Hugh McCall Davenport, a Confederate Army officer, and Martha Anne Elizabeth Stone. She was the granddaughter of the master builder and slaveowner Isaiah Davenport. As a child during the American Civil War, she brought bandages and food to Confederate hospitals and military camps in Savannah. In 1864 Union Army General William Tecumseh Sherman ordered all Confederate officers' families out of Savannah during his March to the Sea, and Raines and her family took refuge in Augusta and, later, Atlanta. When Robert E. Lee surrendered, the family was in Macon. After her father returned from the war, the family stayed in Savannah and then moved to New York.

On February 11, 1873, Raines married Lucian Hamilton Raines. They had five children: Martha Stone Raines, Richard Mitchell Raines, Lucian Hamilton Raines, Jr., Mary Judson Raines, and Davenport Raines.

=== United Daughters of the Confederacy ===
In 1892 Raines responded to a call from the Confederate Veterans' Association of Savannah for women of the city to form their own auxiliary organization. She was elected secretary of the Ladies Auxiliary. At a meeting in December 1893 Raines suggested that the auxiliary form into a permanent organization, and moved to change the name to Daughters of the Confederacy. The chapter was formed and Raines was elected as the first president. She was unaware that, at this time, another society bearing the name "Daughters of the Confederacy" had been organized by Caroline Meriwether Goodlett in Tennessee. Goodlett and Raines were made aware of each other's organizations and joined them together, extending invitations to similar women's societies in Louisiana, Mississippi, and Missouri to create the National Association of the Daughters of the Confederacy. Raines was elected as the first vice president of the United Daughters of the Confederacy, with Nashville becoming the first chapter and Savannah becoming the second chapter. Raines submitted a constitution and bylaws, as well as a design for the organization's insignia. At the Second Annual Convention in Atlanta in 1895, the name of the organization was officially changed to the United Daughters of the Confederacy. She later served as the UDC's honorary president general and as the Custodian of the Southern Cross of Honor. She and Goodlett were known to have a staunch rivalry, and both considered themselves to be the original founder of the United Daughters of the Confederacy.

=== Death ===
Raines died on January 21, 1915, and was buried in the family plot in Laurel Grove Cemetery in Savannah.
