= Geoffrey de Noiers =

English architect

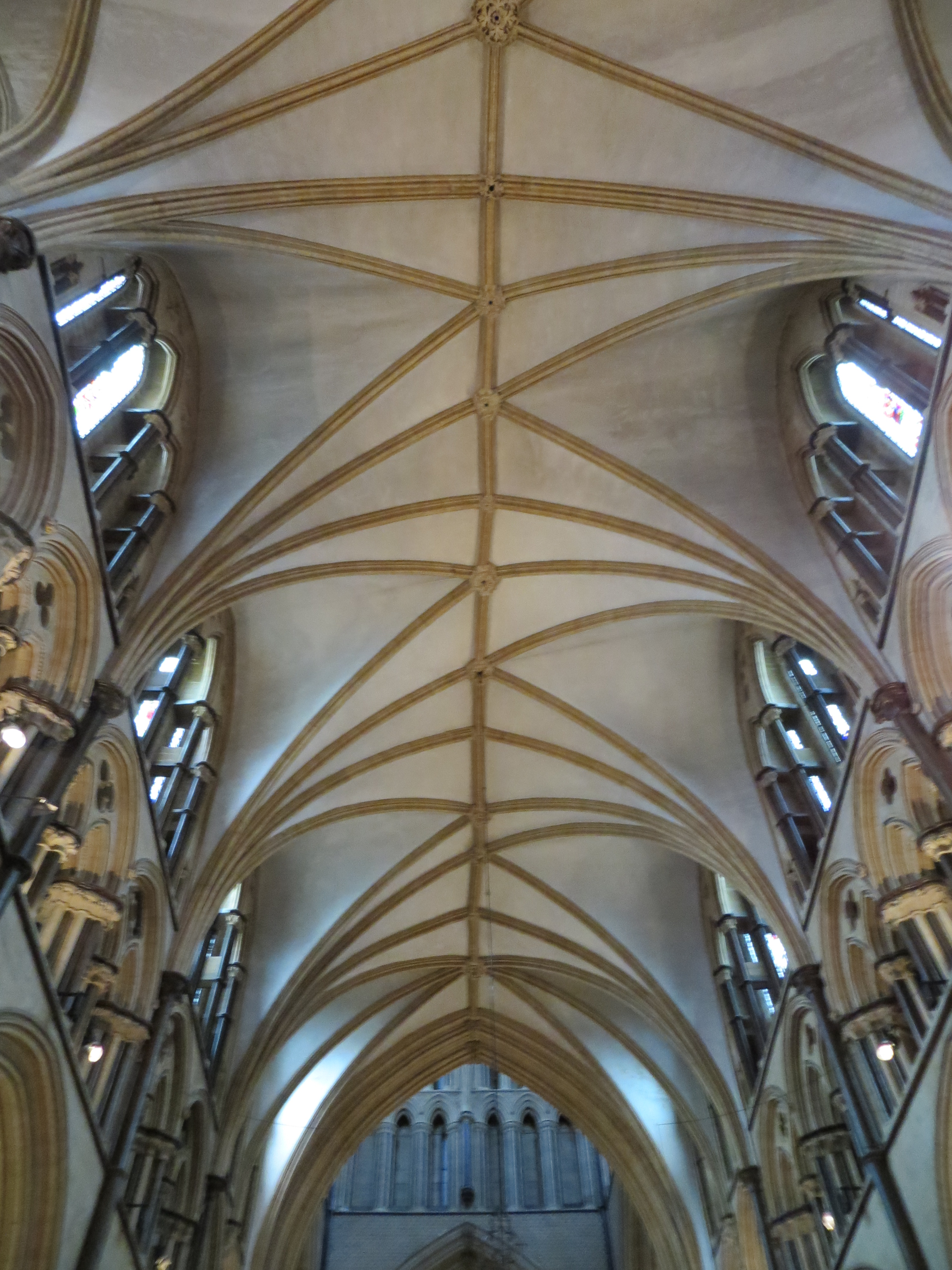
Crazy vaults in St. Hugh's Choir

Geoffrey de Noiers, sometimes styled de Noyer, was a master mason who designed the choir of Lincoln Cathedral in the late 12th century. Between 1192 and 1200 he designed the cathedral's St. Hugh's choir, built in 1208, using an innovative vaulting scheme that represented the first example of decorative vaulting in England. The vaulting of the choir added ribs that skewed the quadripartite vaulting so that bays were slightly offset opposite each other, and have been termed "crazy vaults." They included the first examples of tierceron ribs in Gothic vaulting. The work at Lincoln influenced later work, which developed and elaborated de Noier's concept into an English Gothic specialty. de Noiers was probably French-Normand, having acquired his trade in France. de Noiers was succeeded at Lincoln by Alexander the Mason, who devised tierceron star vaulting in the cathedral's nave.
