= Isaiah Davenport =

American master builder (1784–1827)

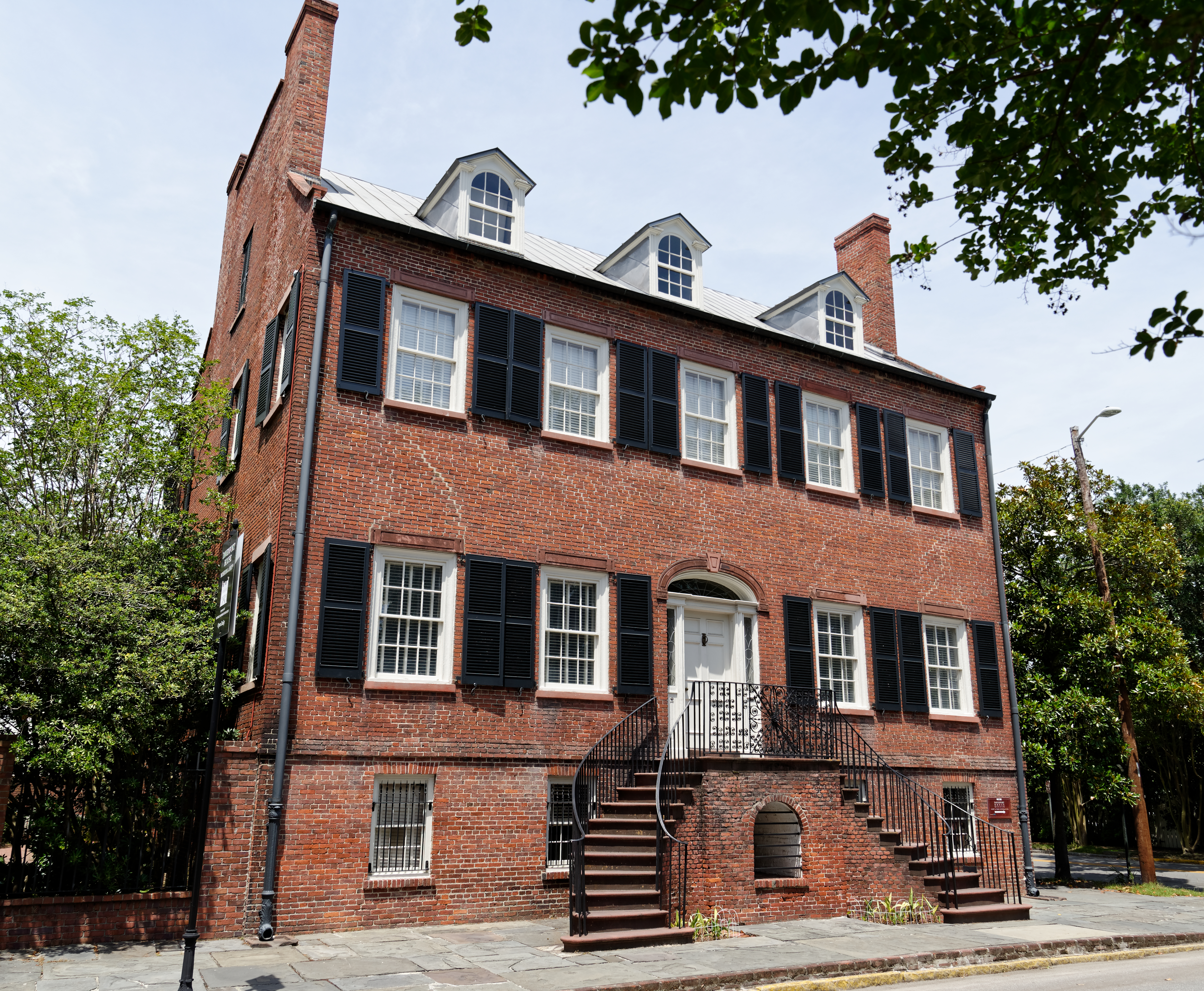
- Isaiah Davenport House in 2020
- Born: November 3, 1784; Little Compton, Rhode Island, U.S.
- Died: October 16, 1827 (aged 42); Savannah, Georgia, U.S.
- Occupation: Master builder
- Spouse: Sarah Rosamund Clarke
- Relatives: Anna Davenport Raines (granddaughter)

Isaiah Davenport (November 3, 1784 – October 16, 1827) was an American master builder, prominent in the American city of Savannah, Georgia, during the early 19th century.

The first property Davenport constructed in Savannah was what is today known as Laura's Cottage, which was originally built at 122 Houston Street, in Greene Ward, between 1799 and 1808 but was moved to 416 East State Street in Columbia Square in 1969. His most notable work, however, was what became his home – the Isaiah Davenport House, built in 1820 in the northwest corner of Columbia Square.

== Early life ==
Davenport was born in 1784 in Little Compton, Rhode Island, to Jonathan and Sara Thurston Davenport. His father, a carpenter, passed his trade to Isaiah and his three siblings: Dudley, Samuel and Thomas.

He apprenticed as a carpenter in New Bedford, Massachusetts, to which his parents had moved before 1790, He moved to Savannah in 1808. He first appears on the city's tax records in 1809.

== Career ==
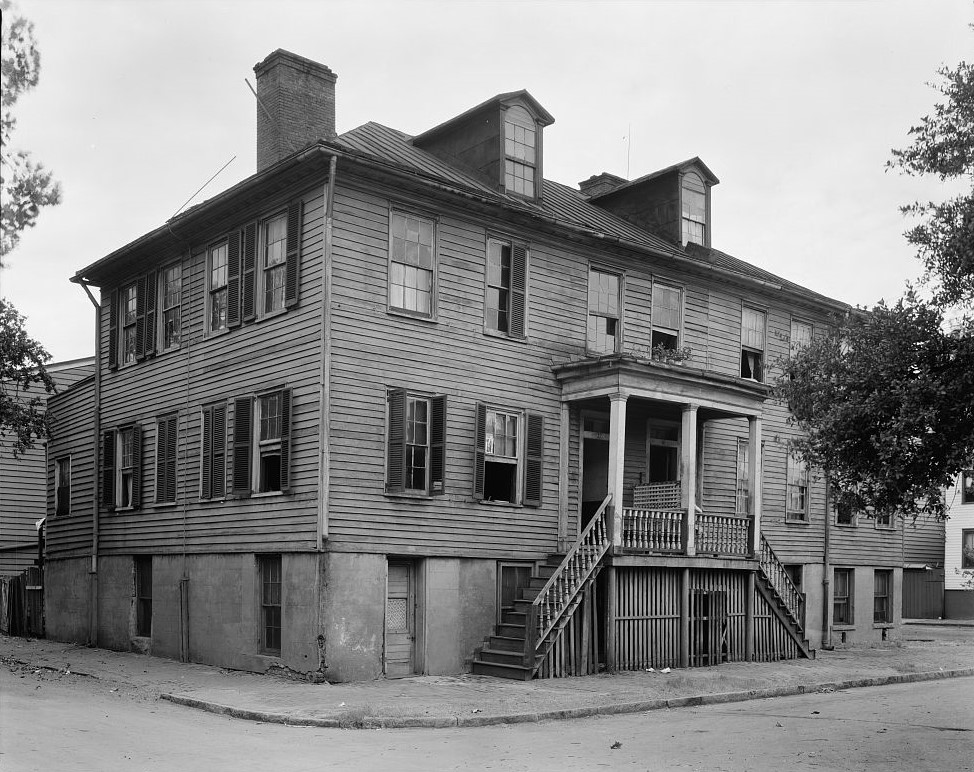
124 Houston Street, Savannah

In addition to his profession, Davenport was a city alderman, serving from 1817 to 1822. He also acted as the firemaster for Greene and Columbia Wards, and as a constable for Columbia Ward.

=== Notable works ===
- "Laura's Cottage", 416 East State Street, Savannah (1799–1808) – moved from Greene Ward
- 124 Houston Street, Savannah (1814–1816)
- Isaiah Davenport House, Savannah (1820)
- Martello tower, Tybee Island (now demolished)

== Personal life ==
Shortly after moving to Savannah in 1808, Davenport married South Carolina native Sarah Rosamund Clarke at Independent Presbyterian Church. They had ten children, three of whom died in childhood.

The Davenports' first child, daughter Susannah Elizabeth, was born in 1810. She was followed two years later by Sarah Rosamund, who died in infancy from teething and a bowel complaint. Also in 1812, the family moved southern half of Lot 8 in Washington Ward, at the corner of Bay and East Broad Streets.

The couple's first son, Thurston Warren, was born in 1813. He died at the age of nine months from dysentery. Their firstborn, Susannah, also died this year, from bilious fever. Another son, Isaiah Jr., was born.

Benjamin Rush Tippens was born in 1817, followed two years later by Archibald Clark.

When President James Monroe visited Savannah in May 1819, to witness the launch of the steamship SS Savannah—the first steamship to achieve a transatlantic voyage—Davenport was present as a local dignitary, delivering a welcome toast. He also served on a city council committee overseeing the laying of oyster shells along Bay Street to prepare for the president's arrival.

Davenport's brother, Samuel, died in 1820, aged 32, from yellow fever. Another son, Henry Kollock, was born the same year.

Hugh McCall Davenport, child number eight, was born in 1822. A daughter, Cornelia Augusta, followed in 1824.

By 1825, Davenport had nine slave under his authority, the most recent being purchased from his mother-in-law Susannah Clarke.

Tenth and final child, Dudley (named for Davenport's brother), was born one month after his father's death.

Davenport's wife converted their home it into a boarding house. She lived in the residence until 1840, when she sold it to the Baynard family of South Carolina. The house remained in their hands until 1955. The building became the Davenport House Museum in 1963. It is now listed on the National Register of Historic Places.

Dudley, the final Davenport brother, died in New Bedford in 1852, at the age of 70 or 71.

Sarah Davenport, then resident of Jones Street, died in 1869, aged 81, having survived her husband by 42 years, which is how old he was when he died.

== Death and legacy ==
Like his brother, Samuel, seven years earlier, Davenport died in 1827 from yellow fever. He was in the process of constructing a mill on Hutchinson Island for the Savannah Steam Saw Mill Company, which may be where he contracted the disease. Originally buried in Savannah's Colonial Park Cemetery, his and three of his children's bodies were eventually moved to Laurel Grove Cemetery.

No photographs or portraits of Davenport exist.
