= Isaiah Davenport House =

Historic house in Savannah, Georgia, US

- U.S. National Register of Historic Places
- U.S. National Historic Landmark District – Contributing property
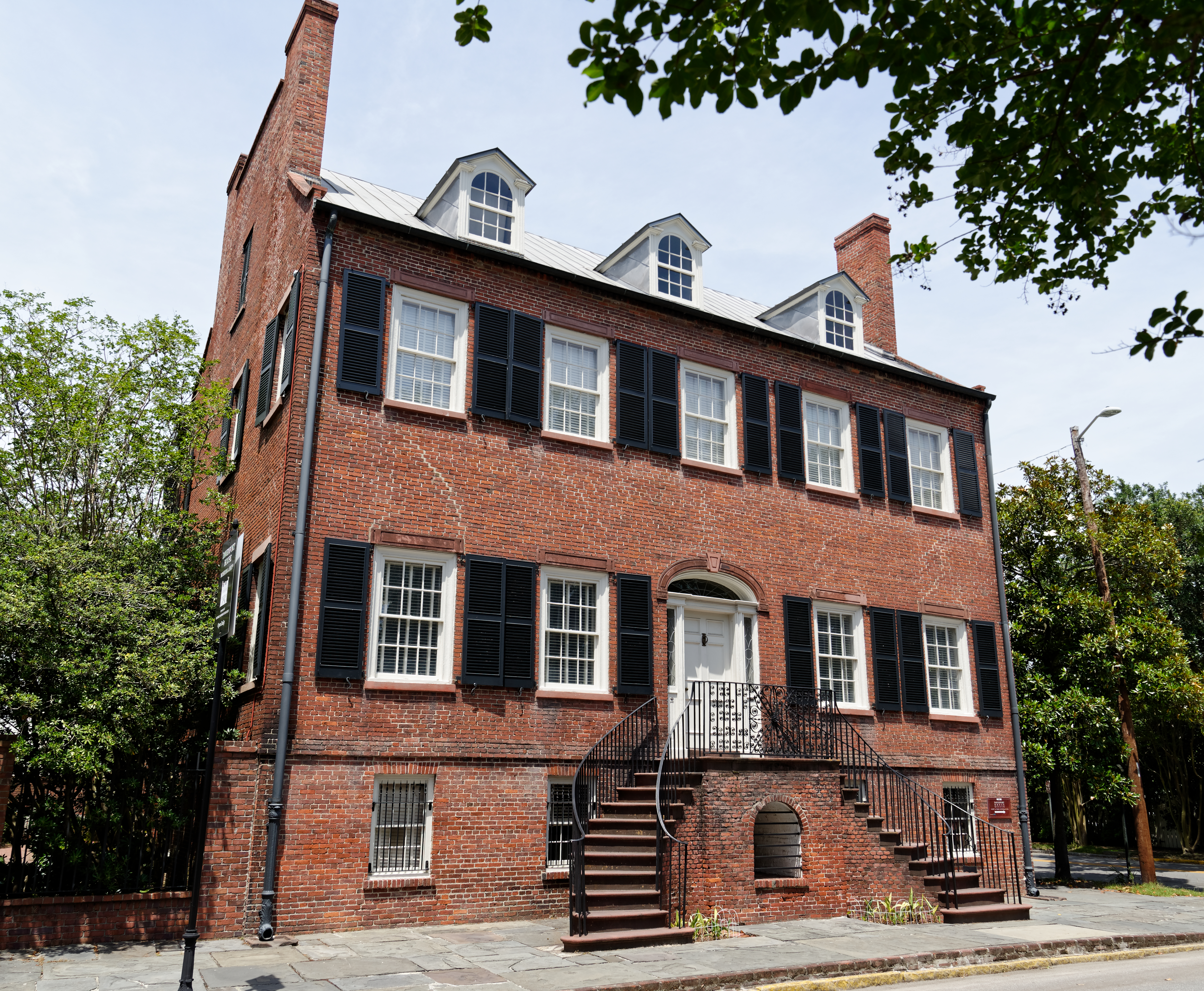
- Pictured in 2020
- Location: 324 East State Street, Savannah, Georgia, U.S.
- Coordinates: 32°04′38″N 81°05′17″W
- Built: 1820 (206 years ago)
- Architect: Isaiah Davenport
- Architectural style: Federal
- Part of: Savannah Historic District (ID66000277)
- NRHP reference No.: 72000374
- Added to NRHP: September 22, 1972

The Isaiah Davenport House is a historic home in Savannah, Georgia, United States. Built in 1820, it has been operated as a historic house museum by the Historic Savannah Foundation since 1963.

The house is located at 324 East State Street, in the northwest corner of Columbia Square.

== Architectural style ==
The Federal-style dwelling neared completion in 1820 and first appeared on the tax rolls 1821. Master builder Isaiah Davenport, a New England native, designed and built the home as a dwelling for his growing household as well as a demonstration of his building skills.

== History ==
The 1820 Federal-style dwelling was built by upwardly mobile artisan Isaiah Davenport and his crew for his growing household, which included his wife, seven children, and nine enslaved workers. It was his family home until his death in 1827 when his wife, Sarah Clark Davenport, converted it into a boarding house. She lived in the residence on Columbia Square until 1840, when she sold it to the Baynard family of South Carolina. The house remained in their hands for the next 109 years.

As time passed, the once stately home in a fashionable neighborhood became a rundown rooming house in a seedy part of town. Even in an advanced state of neglect, New Deal surveyors recognized the architectural significance of the home when they identified and measured it for the Historic American Buildings Survey in the 1930s. Threatened with demolition in 1955, a group of community-spirited citizens joined forces to purchase the Davenport House. This was the first act of the Historic Savannah Foundation, which has gone on to save hundreds buildings in the historic city through its renowned revolving loan fund and other historic preservation activities. In 1955, the Davenport House became the office for Historic Savannah Foundation as well as a family services agency. In 1957, Savannah Landscape Architect Clermont Huger Lee prepared a period-specific landscape plan and wall detail for the garden, later revised by others. Sensing the potential for an historic site, the first floor of the house was restored and opened to the public as a museum on March 9, 1963.

Years later the second and third floors were opened and Historic Savannah Foundation moved its offices to another building. Beginning in the mid-1980s leaders of the museum began an effort to adhere to professional museum standards. In the mid-1990s the museum began another restoration process, with a funding drive headed by Cornelia Groves and Clare Ellis, which resulted in a more authentic experience for museum visitors, including period wallpaper and period room furnishings which reflect the inventory taken at the time of Isaiah Davenport’s death in 1827. Groves also established the Friends of Davenport House in 2003.

== Museum ==
The Davenport House was first opened as a museum in 1963. In 2005, The Davenport House received the Preserve America Presidential Award. In 2010. It received the Georgia Governor's Award in the Humanities.
