= 124 Houston Street =

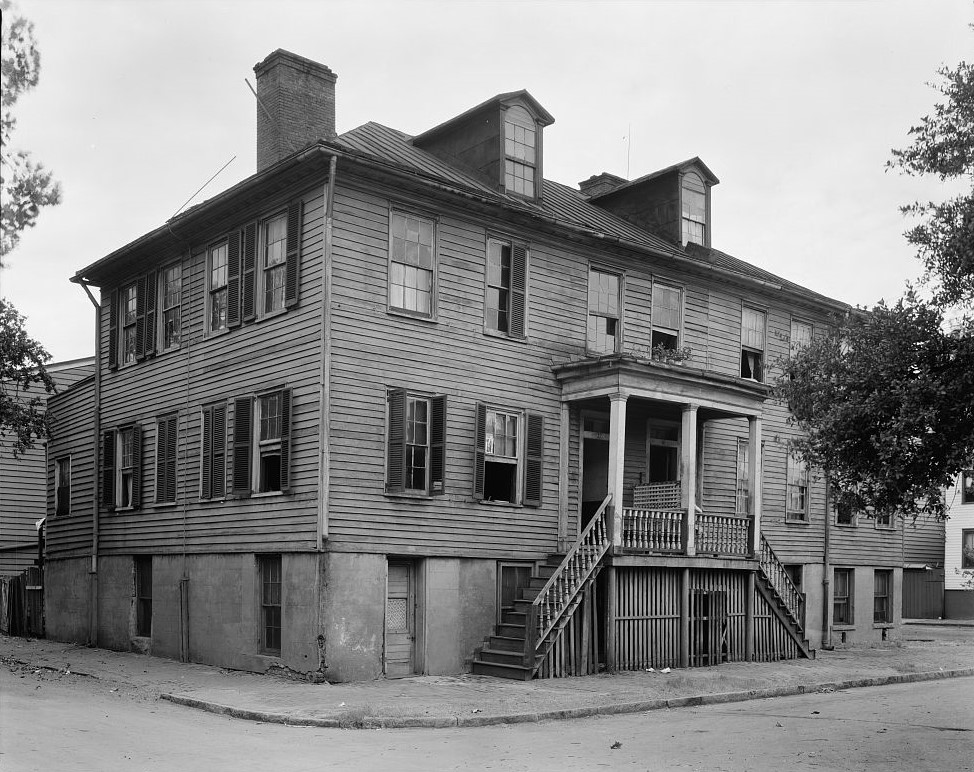
- The building during the Second World War
- Interactive map of the 124 Houston Street area

General information
- Location: Savannah, Georgia, U.S., 124 Houston Street
- Coordinates: 32.07639°N 81.08569°W
- Completed: 1816; 210 years ago

Technical details
- Floor count: 3

Design and construction
- Main contractor: Isaiah Davenport

124 Houston Street is a historic building in Savannah, Georgia, United States. Built by Isaiah Davenport, it is located in the northwestern trust lot of Greene Square and was built between 1814 and 1816. It is part of the Savannah Historic District.

The property formerly extended to the north, right up to East State Street, but it has since been shortened by about one quarter. Its dormer windows have also been removed.

== See also ==
- Buildings in Savannah Historic District
