= Cornelia Groves =

American preservationist (1926–2021)

- Groves pictured around 2015
- Born: Cornelia Susan Rankin; April 23, 1926; Savannah, Georgia, U.S.
- Died: October 31, 2021 (aged 95); Savannah, Georgia, U.S.
- Resting place: Bonaventure Cemetery, Savannah, Georgia, U.S.
- Education: Randolph-Macon Woman's College
- Occupation: Preservationist
- Spouse: Robert Walker Groves Jr. (married unknown–2000)

Cornelia Rankin Groves (April 23, 1926 – October 31, 2021) was an American preservationist. She was one of the founders of Savannah Country Day School and was awarded the highest honor of the Historic Savannah Foundation, the Davenport Award, for her efforts in support of the Isaiah Davenport House.

== Life and career ==
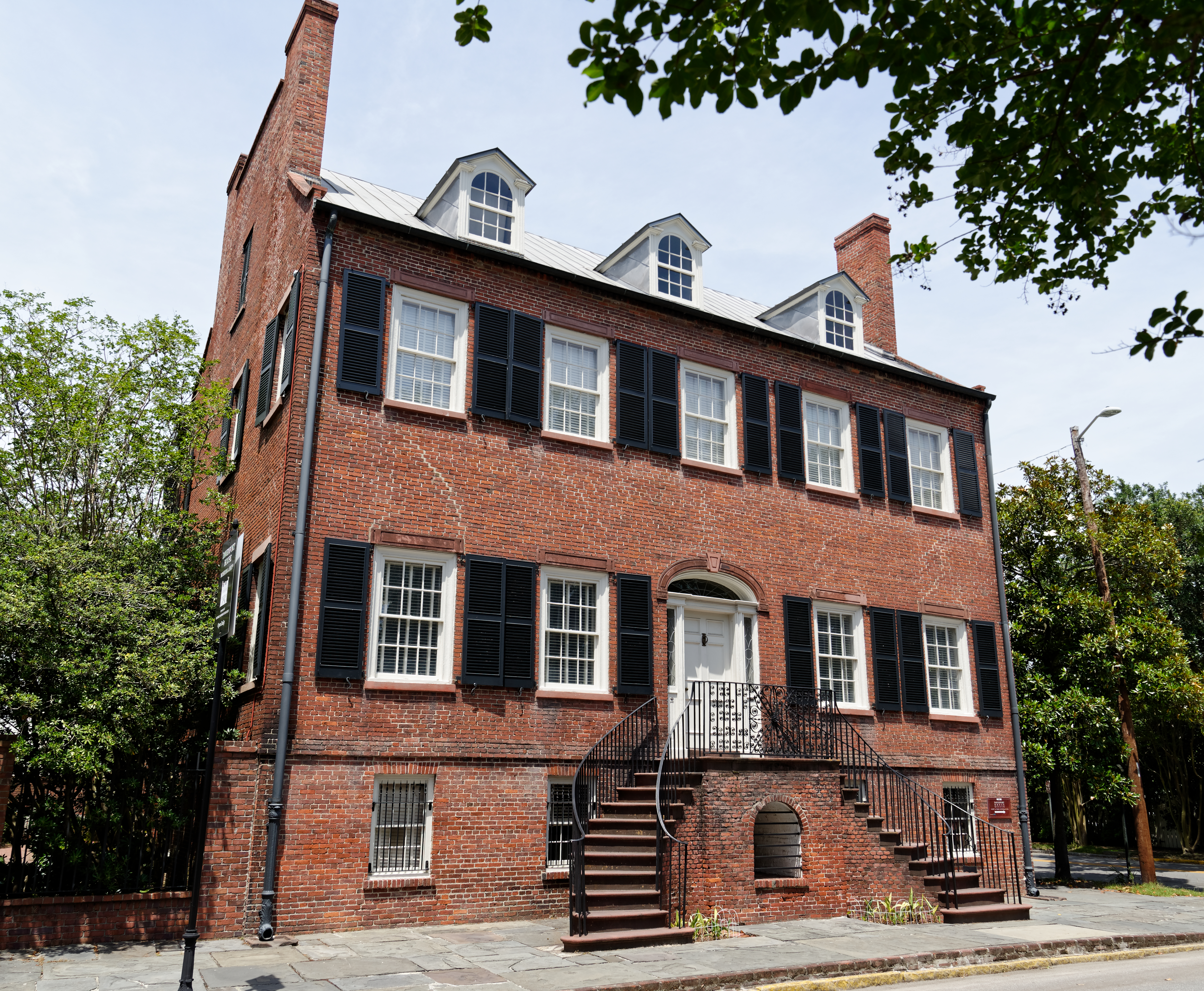
Groves was a tireless supporter of the Isaiah Davenport House in Savannah's Columbia Square

Cornelia Susan Rankin was born on April 23, 1926, in Savannah, Georgia, to William Scott Rankin and Hannay Ellis. Her father died when she was five years old; her mother lived until the age of 98.

She went on to graduate from Savannah's Pape School and Randolph-Macon Woman's College, located in Lynchburg, Virginia. Rankin married Robert Walker Groves Jr., and together they had two children.

Groves fought in support of the Historic Savannah Foundation to get funding for the restoration of the Isaiah Davenport House in Columbia Square of Savannah. She was also a member of the Trustees' Garden, and, along with her sister Ruth, the Colonial Dames of Georgia.

During World War II, Groves "rolled bandages and ran the canteen."

In 1955, Groves was one of the parents involved in the founding of the Savannah Country Day School, which originated from the Pape School. Groves and her husband were also involved in the annual Grandfather Mountain Highland Games event.

In the 1990s, when the Davenport House was in need of funding, Groves and Clare Ellis established an endowment. They regularly met at Groves' home to formulate fundraising ideas, hoping to raise a total of $1 million. Groves founded the Friends of the Davenport House in 2003. The Historic Savannah Foundation awarded Groves its highest honor, the Davenport Award, in 2008.

In 2000, Rankin's husband died at age 82.

Groves was used as a source for Polly Cooper and Laura Lawton's book Savannah's Preservation Story (2016).

== Death and legacy ==
Groves died on October 31, 2021, aged 95. She is interred in Savannah's Bonaventure Cemetery, alongside her husband.
