= Isle of Hope, Georgia =

- Unincorporated community Census-designated place
- Location in Chatham County and the state of Georgia
- Coordinates: 31°59′0″N 81°3′20″W
- Country: United States
- State: Georgia
- County: Chatham

Area
  - Total: 2.28 sq mi (5.91 km^{2})
  - Land: 1.96 sq mi (5.08 km^{2})
  - Water: 0.32 sq mi (0.83 km^{2})
- Elevation: 13 ft (4.0 m)

Population (2020)
  - Total: 2,357
  - Density: 1,202.1/sq mi (464.12/km^{2})
- Time zone: UTC-5 (Eastern (EST))
  - Summer (DST): UTC-4 (EDT)
- FIPS code: 13-41484
- GNIS feature ID: 0332069

Isle of Hope is an unincorporated community and census-designated place (CDP) in Chatham County, Georgia, United States. It is part of the Savannah Metropolitan Statistical Area. As of the 2020 census, Isle of Hope had a population of 2,357. The island is one of the most affluent communities in the state and is well known for its historic plantations, including Wormsloe, and exclusive waterfront properties.

== History ==
Isle of Hope is an island surrounded on all sides by water at high tide. Early maps referred to in French as "L'Isle Desperance" (modern French: L'Île d'Espérance). Legends abound of pirates using the island to hide their booty, and generations of children have gone digging for this treasure. Legend also states that French Huguenots used the island as a place of refuge for fleeing persecution.

In 1733, when General James Oglethorpe founded the Georgia colony, a surveyor named Noble Jones was granted a tract on the island that was eventually named Wormsloe, possibly after an English estate but more probably due to the mulberry trees that were grown there, the worms of which, it was hoped, would form the basis for a silk industry. A Colonial-era fortified home made of tabby was built at the Skidaway Narrows (now Jones' Narrows) and today can be visited as part of Wormsloe Historic Site.

Jones, along with James Fallowfield and Henry Parker, settled permanently on the island. During nearby Savannah's frequent yellow fever epidemics, the island was host to Savannahians fleeing the miasma of the city's fevers. As greater numbers of people discovered the island, the former plantation lands were subdivided and the lots sold, and it became a fashionable summer retreat. Several homes from the antebellum period remain, including the 1820 former caretaker's cottage of Carsten Hall plantation. Although the plantation itself burned in the early 20th century, the family moved into the caretaker's cottage overlooking the Intracoastal Waterway.

In the early 20th century, with better transportation options, the summer resort became the year-round home of many, and the terrapin farm at Barbee's Pavilion became world-famous for the export of terrapins for stew, including to the major restaurants of New York City and to the Czar of Russia. It was also the destination of race car drivers from around the world for the International Grand Prix races.

The Isle of Hope United Methodist Church is another historic location on the island. Built before the Civil War, the property was used by the Confederates as an encampment and the church building as a hospital. During their recuperation, soldiers carved their initials into the pews, which they used for makeshift beds. When the old church burned down during its 1984 renovation, the pews had been removed and were saved. Thirty-three Confederate soldiers are buried in the churchyard. In 2000, the church finished construction of transepts to the main sanctuary structure.

The island's beauty and history has attracted a number of Hollywood film productions, including the Oscar-winning Glory, the original Cape Fear, The Last of the Belles, Forrest Gump, and The Last Song.

== Geography ==
Isle of Hope is located southeast of Savannah at 31°59′0″N 81°3′20″W (31.983380, -81.055686). It consists of the northern half of the physical Isle of Hope, a body of land surrounded by tidal inlets: the Moon River and Herb River to the northwest, Grimball Creek to the northeast, and the Skidaway River and Skidaway Narrows, part of the Intracoastal Waterway, to the southeast. The CDP is bordered by the Dutch Island CDP to the northeast and the Skidaway Island CDP to the southeast. The Isle of Hope CDP includes the communities of Parkersburg and Wymberley.

According to the United States Census Bureau, the CDP has a total area of 2.3 square miles (5.9 km^{2}), of which 1.8 square miles (4.7 km^{2}) is land and 0.46 square miles (1.2 km^{2}), or 20.61%, is water.

== Demographics ==
Historical population
Census	Pop.	Note	%±
1990	2,637		—
2000	2,605		−1.2%
2010	2,402		−7.8%
2020	2,357		−1.9%
U.S. Decennial Census; 1850-1870 1870-1880; 1890-1910 1920-1930; 1940 1950 1960; 1970 1980 1990; 2000 2010 2020

Isle of Hope first appeared as a census designated place in the 1990 U.S. census.

=== Racial and ethnic composition ===
Isle of Hope CDP, Georgia – Racial and ethnic composition Note: the US Census treats Hispanic/Latino as an ethnic category. This table excludes Latinos from the racial categories and assigns them to a separate category. Hispanics/Latinos may be of any race.
Race / Ethnicity (NH = Non-Hispanic)	Pop 2000	Pop 2010	Pop 2020	% 2000	% 2010	% 2020
White alone (NH)	2,540	2,293	2,203	97.50%	95.46%	93.47%
Black or African American alone (NH)	22	32	19	0.84%	1.33%	0.81%
Native American or Alaska Native alone (NH)	0	1	0	0.00%	0.04%	0.00%
Asian alone (NH)	9	27	9	0.35%	1.12%	0.38%
Pacific Islander alone (NH)	0	0	0	0.00%	0.00%	0.00%
Some Other Race alone (NH)	1	2	4	0.04%	0.08%	0.17%
Mixed Race or Multi-Racial (NH)	5	15	43	0.19%	0.62%	1.82%
Hispanic or Latino (any race)	28	32	79	1.07%	1.33%	3.35%
Total	2,605	2,402	2,357	100.00%	100.00%	100.00%

=== 2020 census ===
As of the 2020 census, Isle of Hope had 2,357 residents. The median age was 48.4 years. About 20.0% of residents were under age 18 and 25.2% were age 65 or older. For every 100 females, there were 91.8 males, and for every 100 females age 18 and over, there were 89.4 males age 18 and over.

All residents lived in urban areas, while 0.0% lived in rural areas.

There were 991 households in Isle of Hope, of which 28.2% had children under age 18. Of all households, 61.5% were married-couple households, 10.4% had a male householder with no spouse or partner present, and 25.4% had a female householder with no spouse or partner present. About 23.4% of households were made up of individuals, and 14.2% had someone living alone who was age 65 or older.

There were 1,067 housing units, of which 7.1% were vacant. The homeowner vacancy rate was 3.2%, and the rental vacancy rate was 9.5%.

=== 2000 census ===
As of the census of 2000, there were 2,605 people, 1,001 households, and 783 families residing in the CDP. The population density was 1,373.2 inhabitants per square mile (530.2/km^{2}). There were 1,038 housing units at an average density of 547.2 per square mile (211.3/km^{2}). The racial makeup of the CDP was 98.27% White, 0.84% African American, 0.35% Asian, 0.27% from other races, and 0.27% from two or more races. Hispanic or Latino of any race were 1.07% of the population.

There were 1,001 households, out of which 36.0% had children under the age of 18 living with them, 67.6% were married couples living together, 8.1% had a female householder with no husband present, and 21.7% were non-families. 19.8% of all households were made up of individuals, and 10.2% had someone living alone who was 65 years of age or older. The average household size was 2.60 and the average family size was 3.00.

In the CDP, the population was spread out, with 26.6% under the age of 18, 4.2% from 18 to 24, 25.4% from 25 to 44, 26.9% from 45 to 64, and 16.8% who were 65 years of age or older. The median age was 42 years. For every 100 females, there were 92.5 males. For every 100 females age 18 and over, there were 85.5 males.

The median income for a household in the CDP was $75,274, and the median income for a family was $79,586. Males had a median income of $52,175 versus $38,468 for females. The per capita income for the CDP was $34,067. None of the families and 0.2% of the population were living below the poverty line, including no under eighteens and none of those over 64.

== Education ==
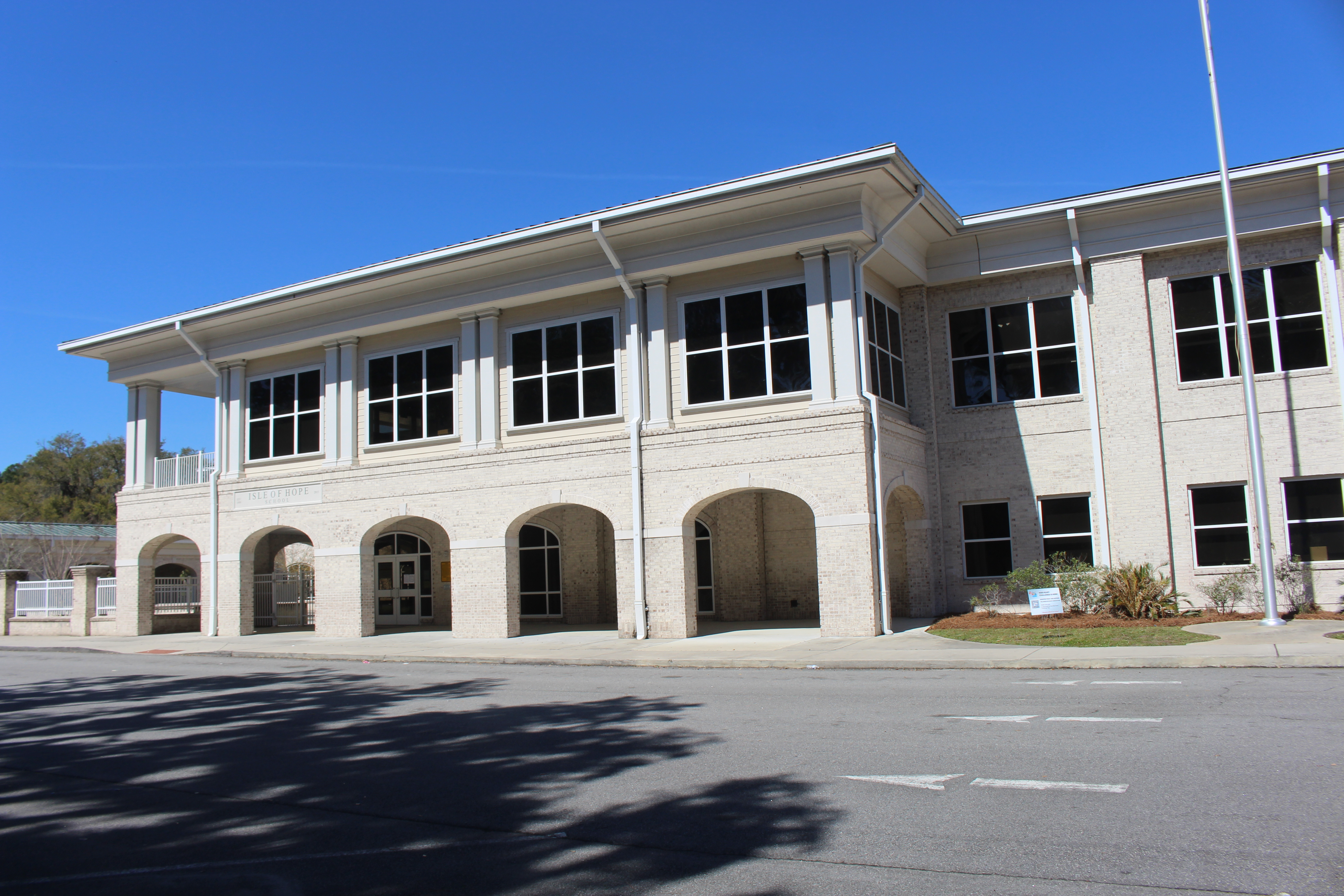
Isle of Hope K-8 School

It is in the Savannah-Chatham County Public Schools. Schools include:

- Isle of Hope K-8 School

== Notable people ==
- Anna Davenport Raines, founding vice president of the United Daughters of the Confederacy
- Associate Justice of the Supreme Court of the United States Clarence Thomas attended St. John Vianney's Minor Seminary on the Isle of Hope in the 1960s.
- Jack Kingston, former congressman from the 1st District of Georgia

== Gallery ==
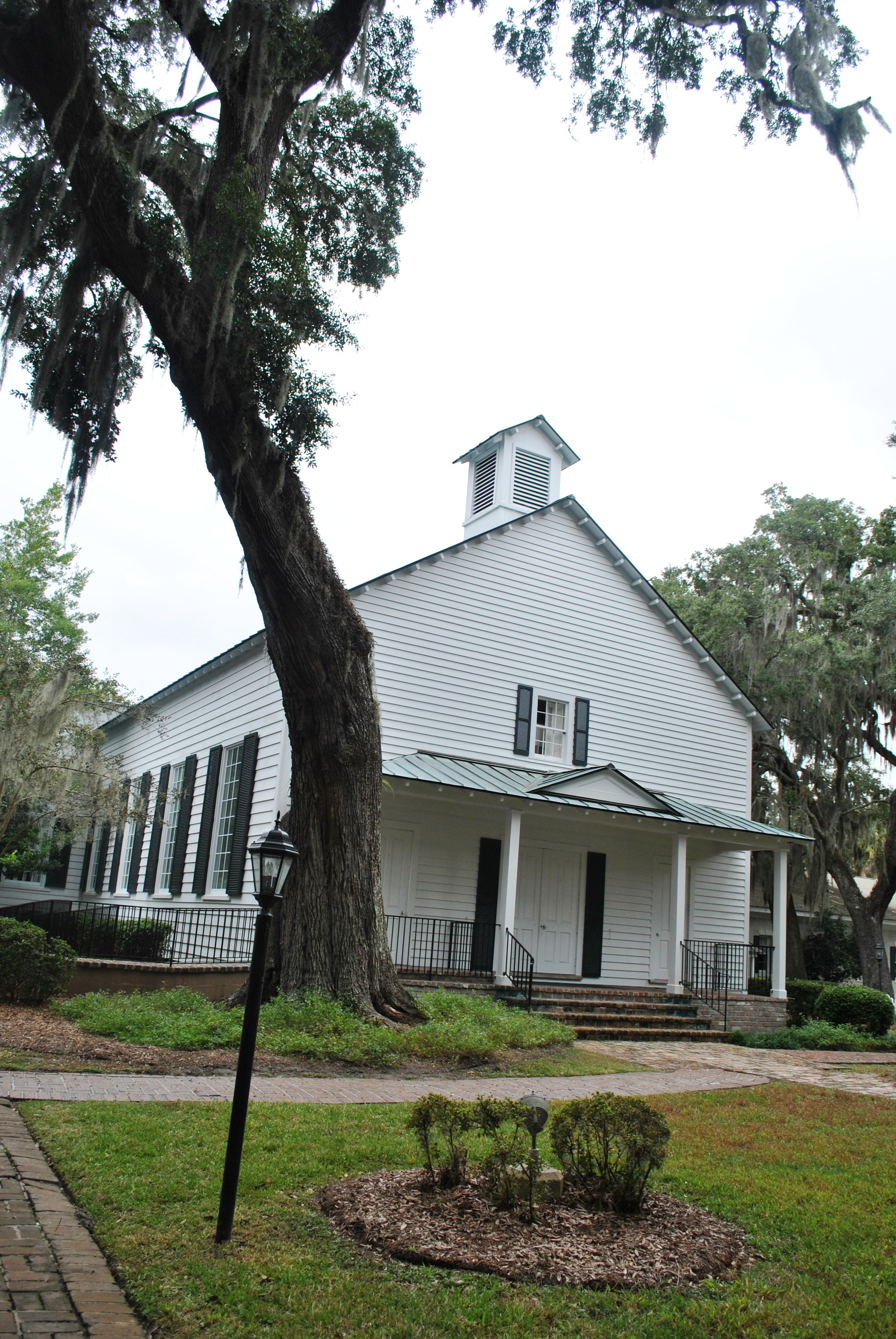
Isle of Hope United Methodist Church

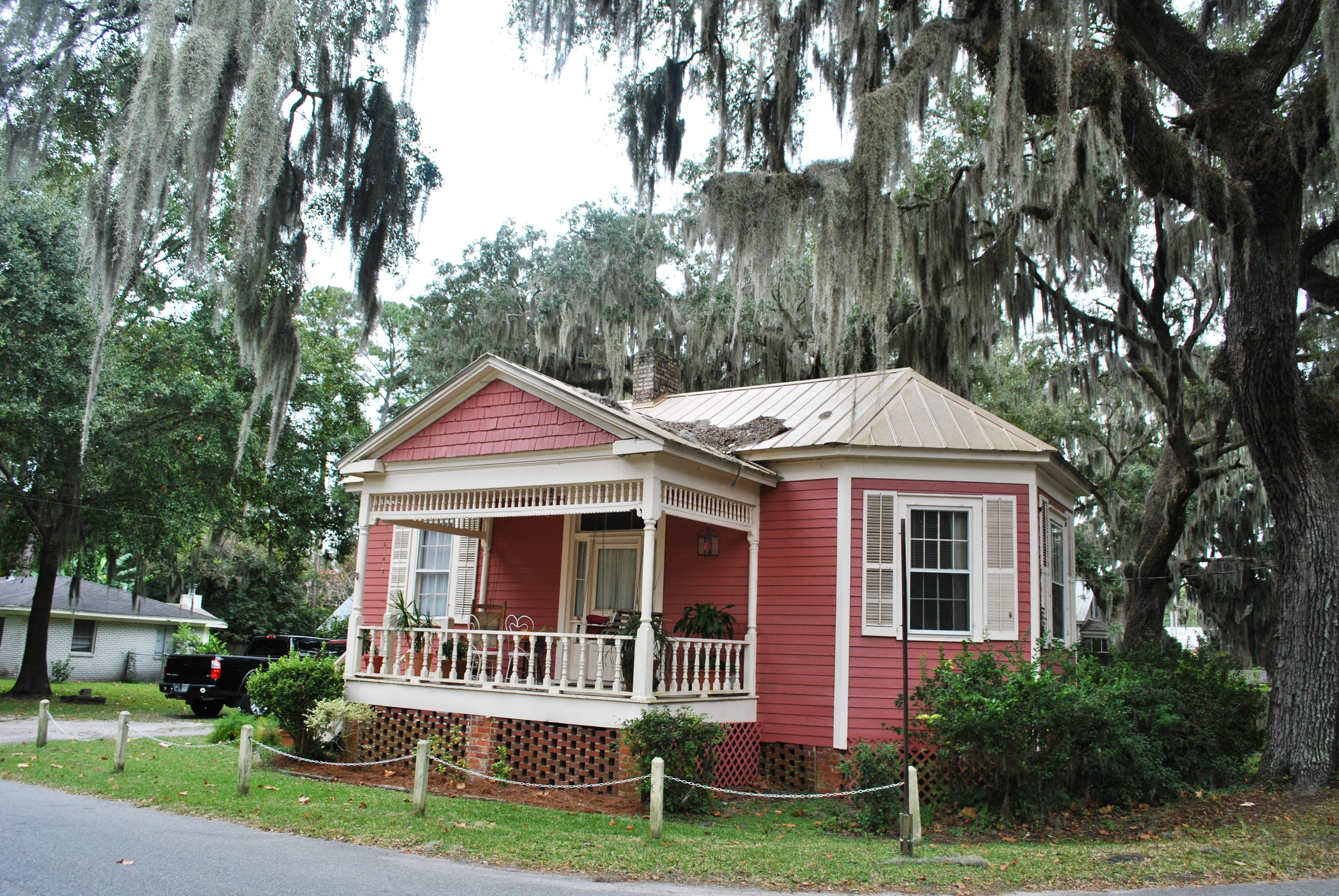
Isle of Hope Historic District

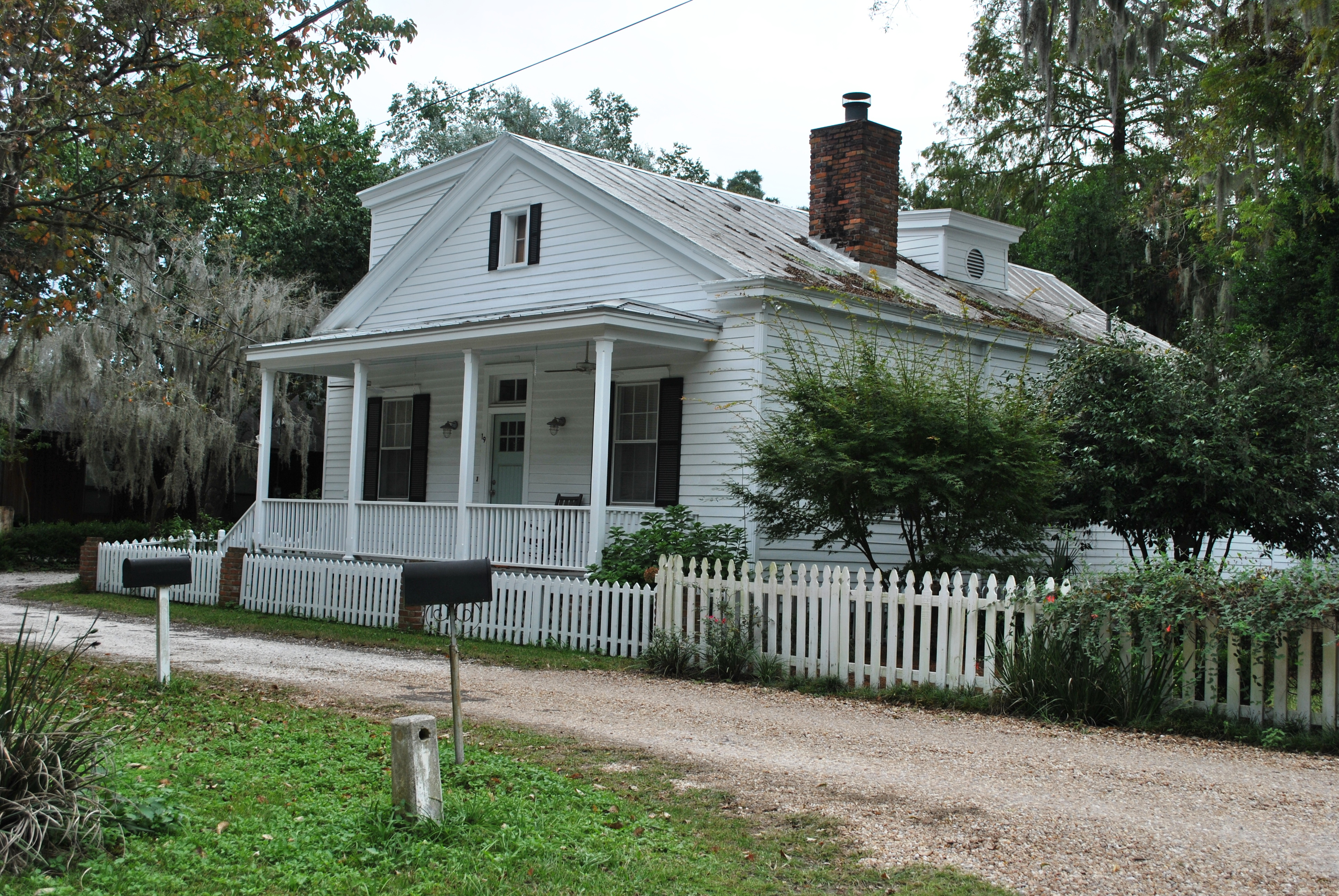
Isle of Hope Historic District

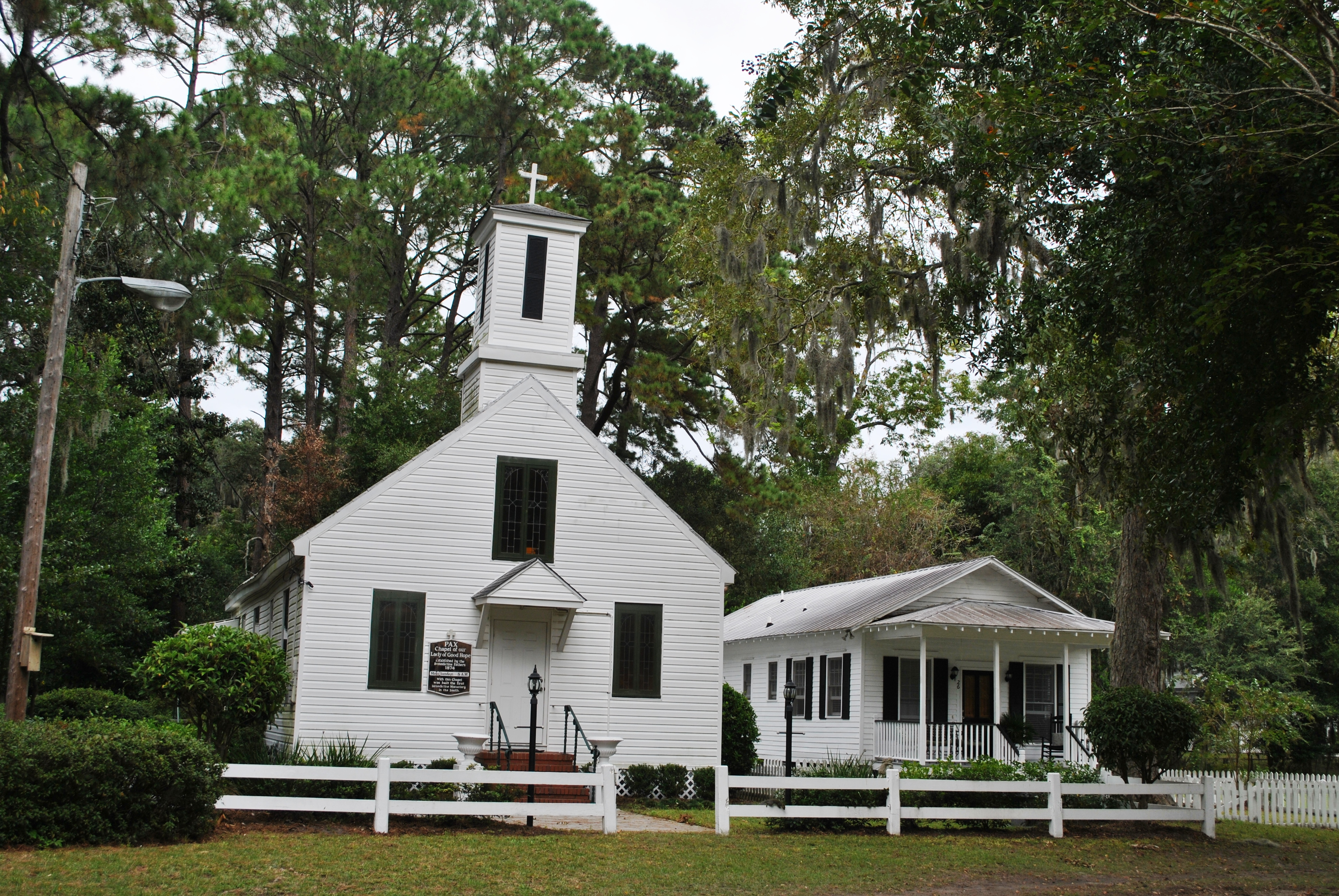
Our Lady of Good Hope Catholic Chapel

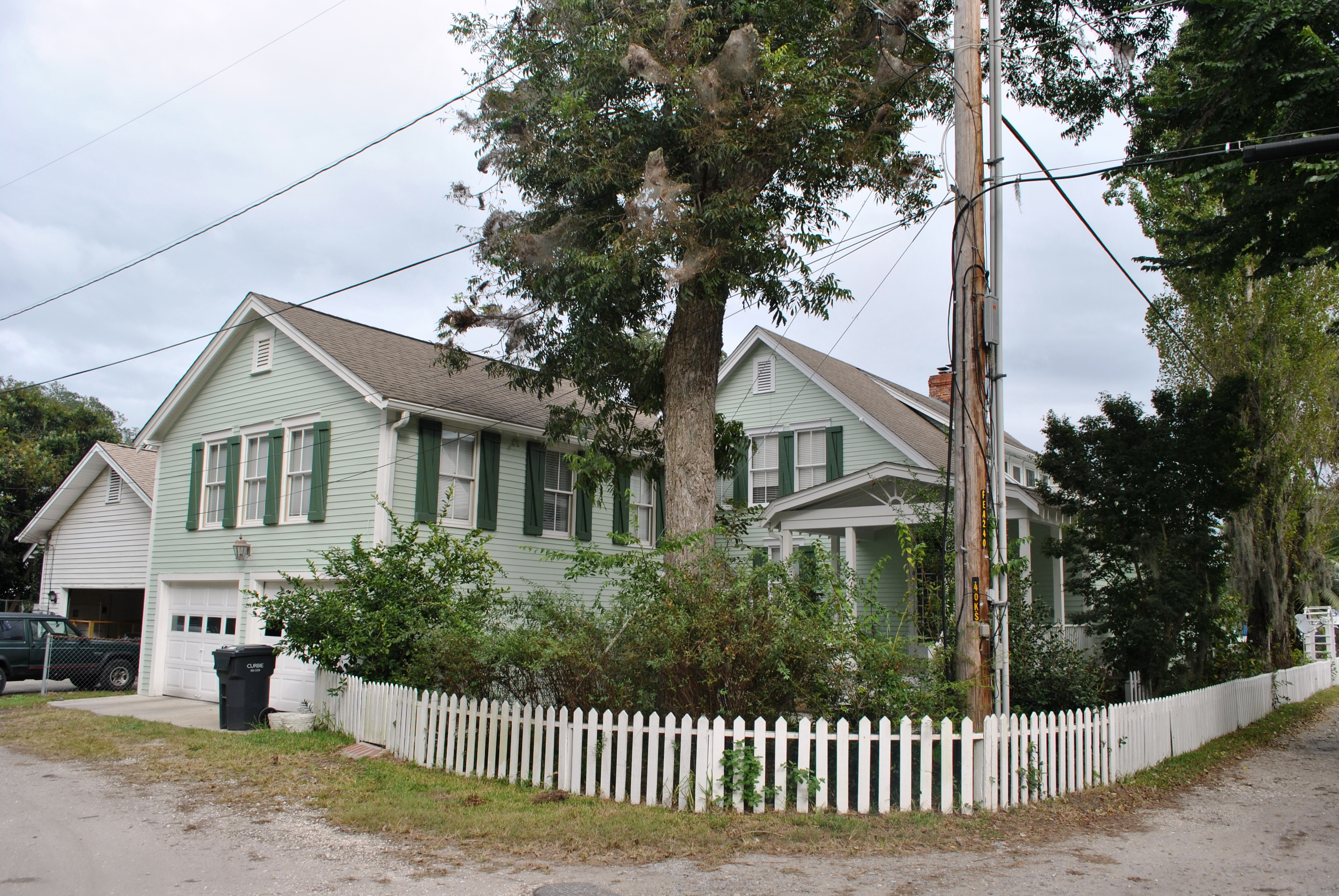
Isle of Hope Historic District

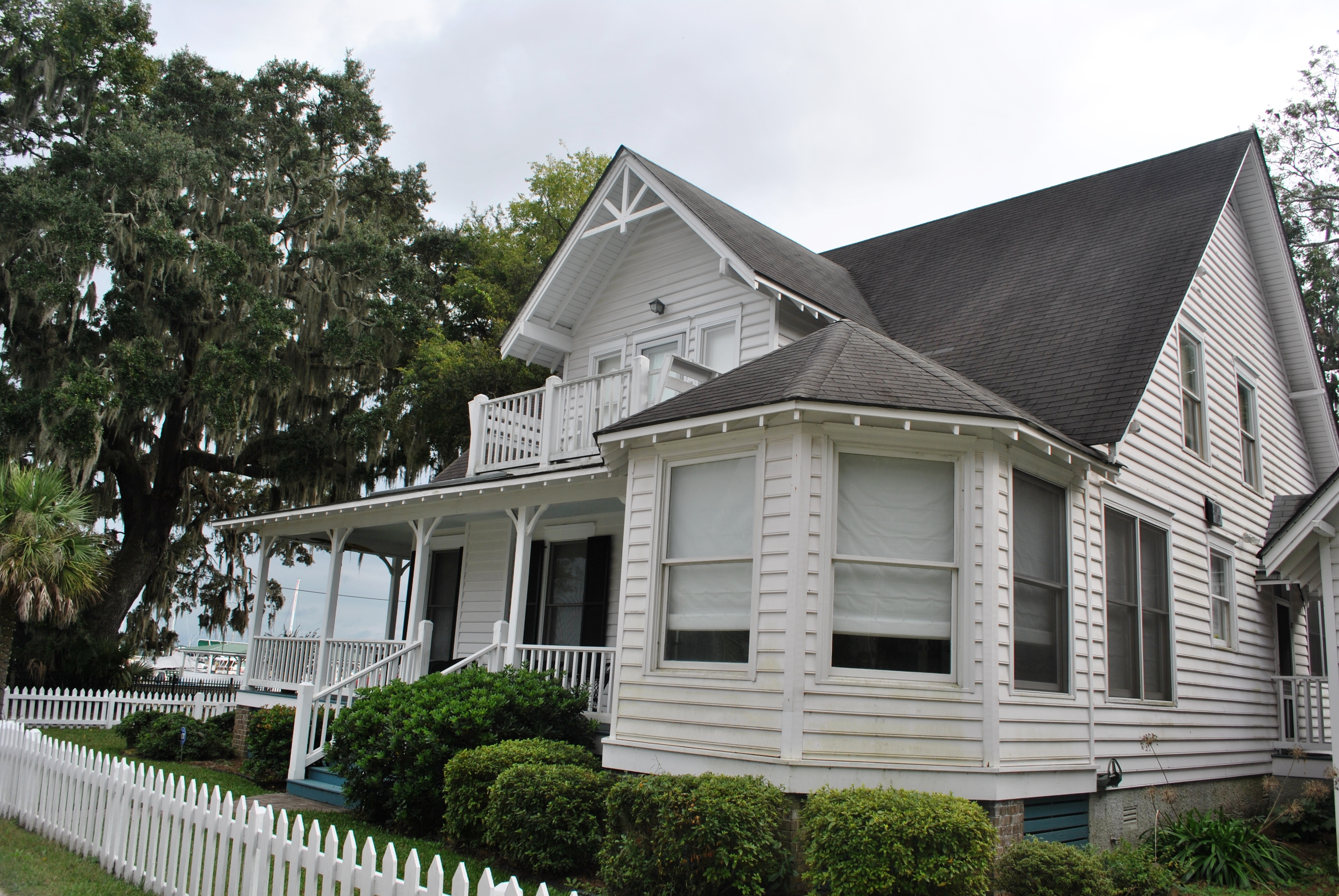
Isle of Hope Historic District

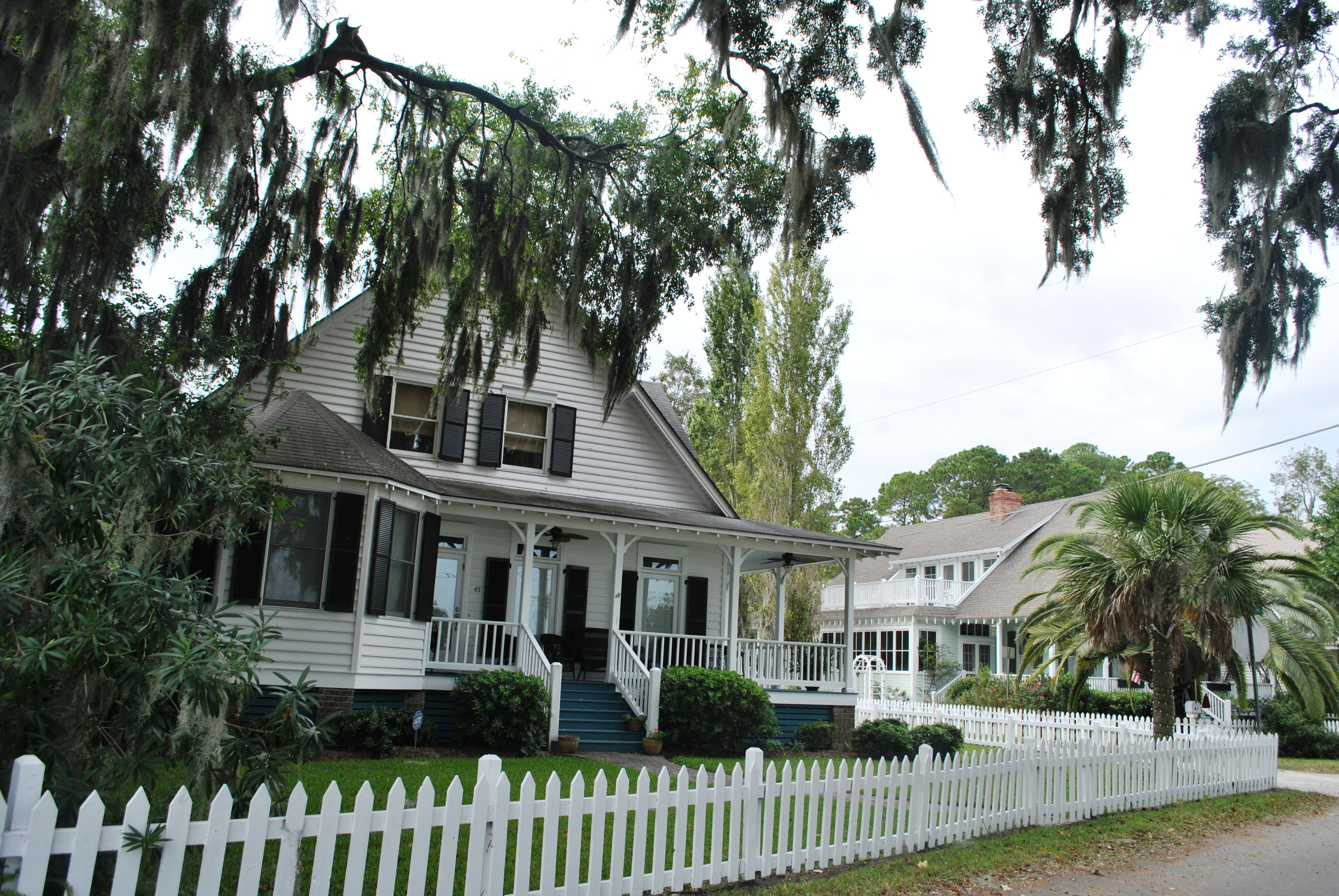
Isle of Hope Historic District

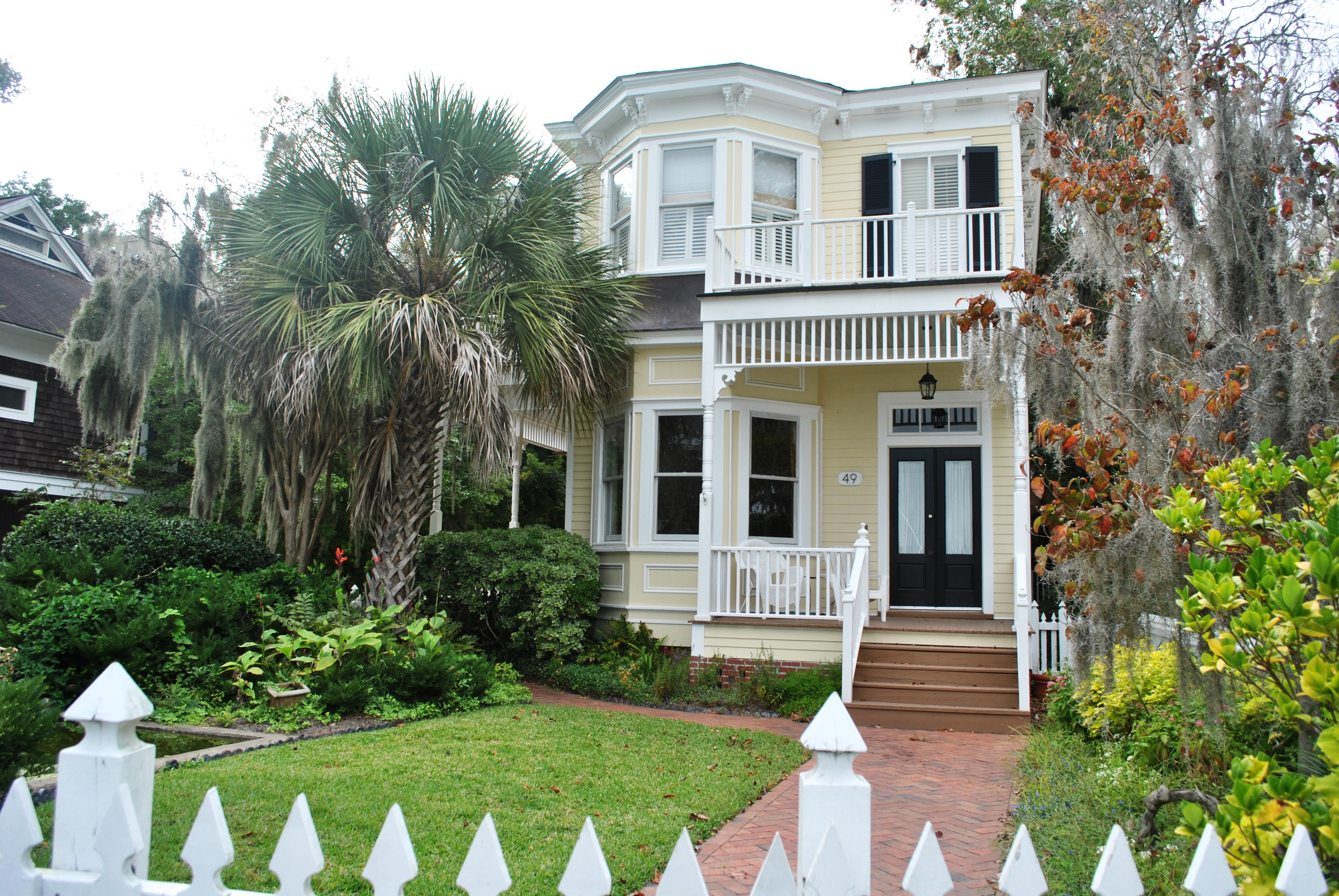
Isle of Hope Historic District

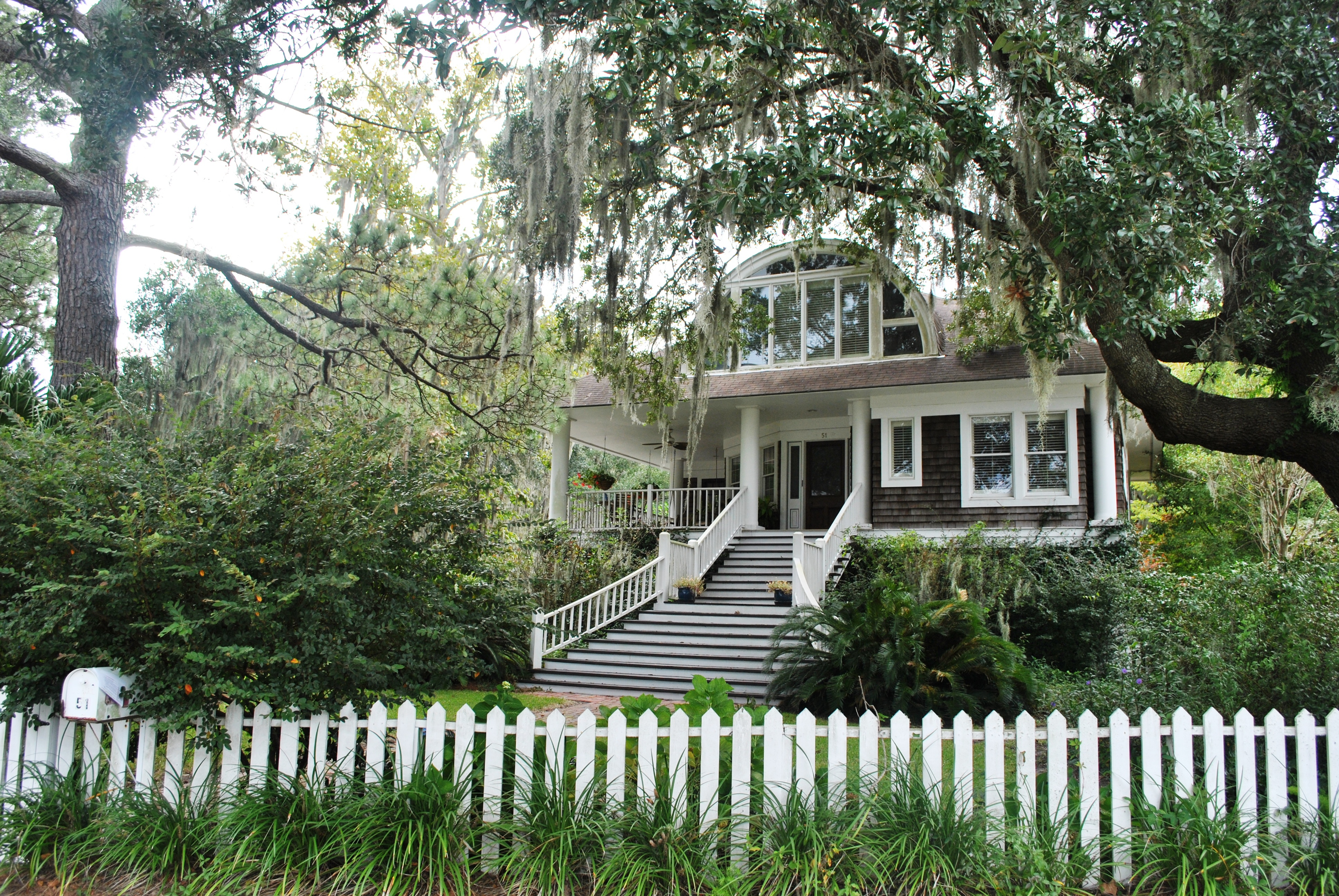
Isle of Hope Historic District

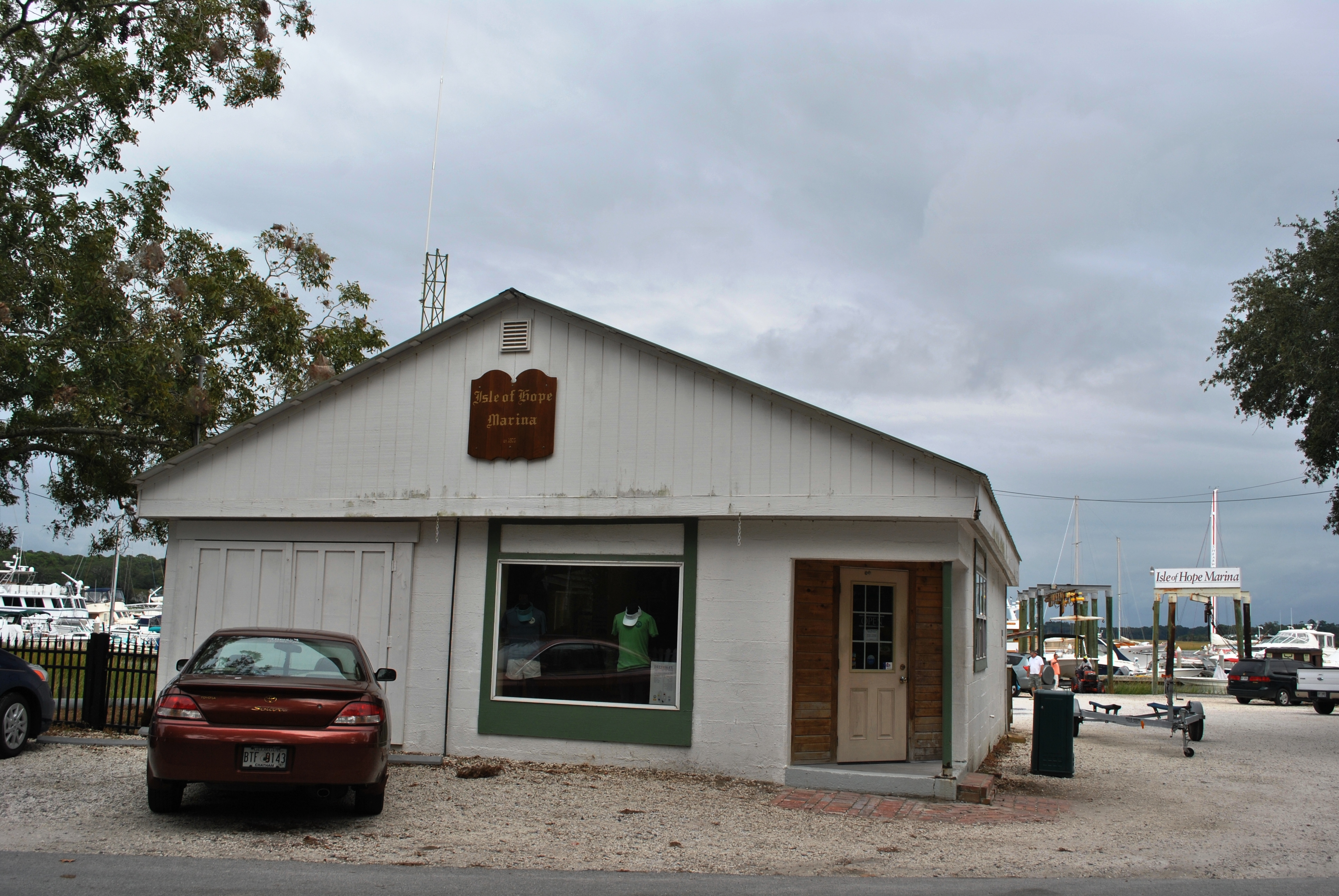
Isle of Hope Marina, 1926

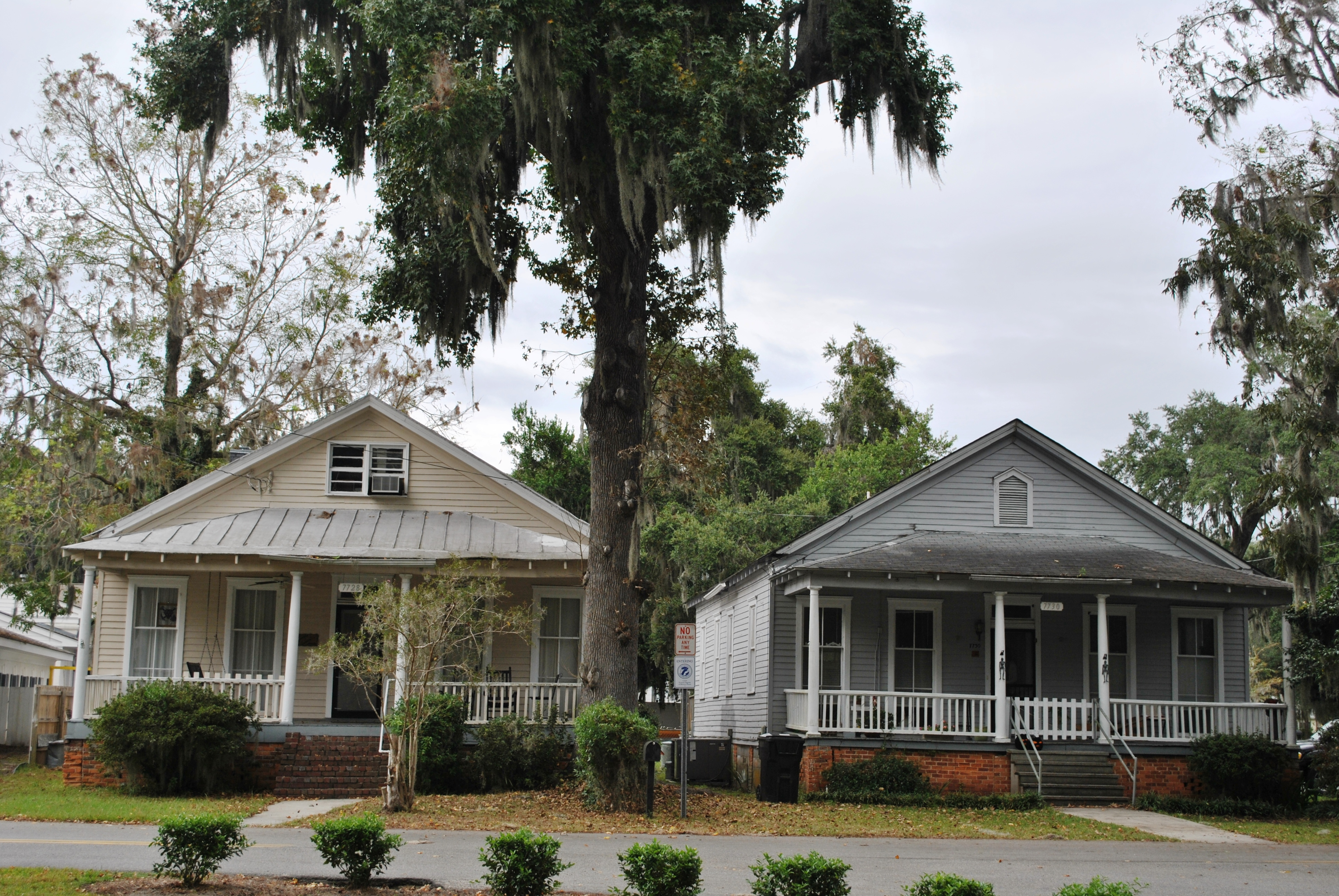
Isle of Hope Historic District
