= Savannah Country Day School =

Private school in Savannah, Georgia, US

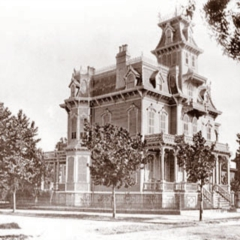
- Vintage Pape School photo

Location
- 824 Stillwood Drive; Savannah, Georgia 31419; United States; 31°58′08″N 81°08′26″W

Information
- Type: Private, day, college-prep
- Motto: Usus Per Scientiam Moresque (Service through knowledge and character)
- Established: 1955 (71 years ago)
- CEEB code: 112700
- Head of school: Kef L. Wilson
- Faculty: 251
- Grades: PK–12
- Gender: Co-educational
- Enrollment: 1,051 (2019-20)
- Average class size: 75
- Campus size: 65 acres
- Colors: Green and gold
- Athletics conference: GIAA
- Mascot: The Hornet
- Nickname: Hornets
- Website: www.savcds.org

The Savannah Country Day School (SCDS, Country Day) is an independent college preparatory school founded in 1955 in Savannah, Georgia, United States. The co-educational school serves students from pre-kindergarten through to twelfth grade, and has 1,028 students enrolled.

== History ==
Savannah Country Day School originates from the founding of the Pape School by Nina Anderson Pape in 1905. Savannah Country Day School itself was founded in 1955 by a group of parents (including Cornelia Groves), with the school taking over the assets and faculty of Pape School, including the facilities east of Forsyth Park, and the school's curriculum. In 1960, the school moved to its current Windsor Park location, south of Savannah. A book titled Service Through Knowledge and Character details the school's history. The first headmaster was Robert W. Trusdell and first upper school principal was Thomas Triol, whose wife Helen taught chemistry and physics.

In the 1970s, the school decided to not affiliate with the Episcopal Church when the Bishop made it clear that the school would have to enroll substantially higher number of African Americans.

In 1983, Dr. Paul M. Pressly became the school's headmaster. A Rhodes scholar who earned degrees from Princeton University, Harvard University and Oxford University, Dr. Pressly helped develop a long-range plan for the school.

In 1991, a visiting committee from the U.S. Department of Education named Country Day a National School of Excellence, one of only ten independent schools in the nation to receive that award. The school was honored by the Blue Ribbon Schools Program in December 1992.

In 2013, Kef L. Wilson became the school's new headmaster. He is the eighth headmaster since the school's inception in 1905.

== Academics ==
Savannah Country Day School has been named "Best Private School" by Savannah Magazine and has been honored as the "Best Private School" by Connect Savannah.

The curriculum is divided between lower school (junior-kindergarten to fifth grade), middle school (sixth grade to eighth grade), and upper school (ninth grade to twelfth grade). The average class size is sixteen students with a student:teacher ratio of 10:1.

A "Little School" exists for children between the ages of six weeks and three years. The school also offers summer programs for children in the form of day camp experiences. Activities include academics, arts, athletics, and outdoor experiences.

== Admissions ==
The school has an acceptance rate of 50%.

== Campus ==
Savannah Country Day School's campus is located on a wooded 65-acre campus on Savannah's south side in the Windsor Forest neighborhood. In 2005, the school completed construction on the Nina Anderson Pape Middle School building. In 2008, the school officially opened a new LEED Silver-certified lower school.

== Fine arts ==
In 2011, the Savannah Country Day School chorus was one of 14 choirs selected to perform Handel's "Messiah" live at Lincoln Center in New York. The show was reviewed by The New York Times, which described it as a "full-throttle" experience.

== Environmental stewardship ==
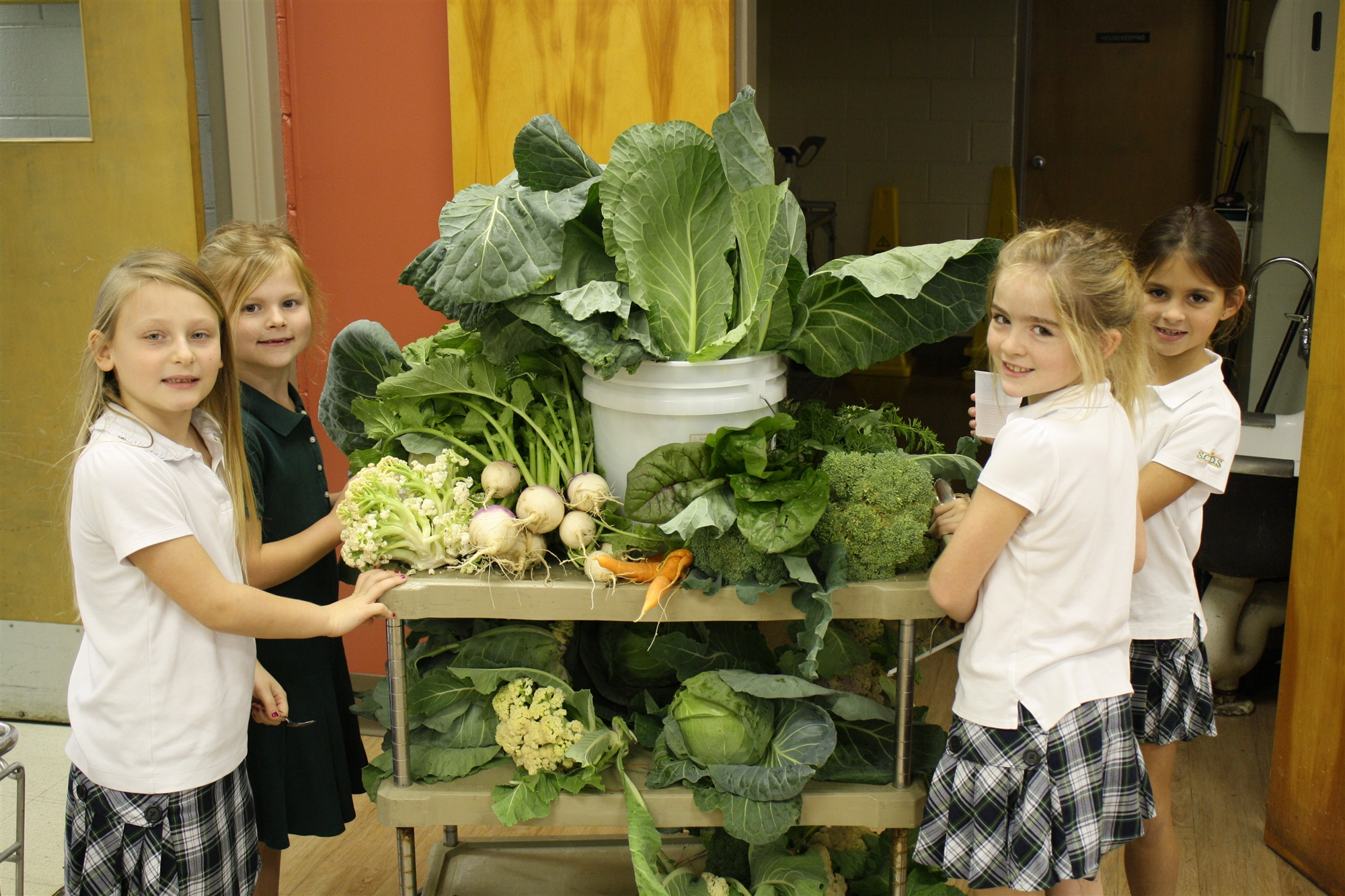
Students with vegetables from the organic garden

In 2012, the U.S. Department of Education recognized Country Day as a Green Ribbon School in honor of its commitment to environmental stewardship. In 2011, the school was given the nation's first Green Flag award by the National Wildlife Federation.

In 2008, the school dedicated the first Silver LEED-certified lower school in Chatham County. The 52,500-square-foot lower school building includes the following environmental features:

- Non-toxic paint and carpet
- A roof system to catch and store rain in an underground cistern, then used to water the gardens
- Energy saving windows
- Carpets, paints and cabinets with reduced volatile organic compounds
- Surrounding landscaping and gardens with plants and shrubbery requiring minimal water
- An 800-gallon aquacenter
- A butterfly garden equipped with cameras to show the different stages of butterflies
- Countertops made from recycled material
- Low-water urinals and water heads

Since the school's first vegetable garden was planted in the 1970s, the school has expanded to include a Butterfly Garden, Herb Garden, Fruit Garden, Brown Thumb Garden, Monet Garden, Organic Spot, Shakespeare Garden and Pangaea Garden. Throughout the school year, third-grade students plant, tend, harvest and eat fruits and vegetables grown on campus in the SCDS cafeteria. Students also donate vegetables from the garden to a local food bank.
