= Master builder =

Official overseeing building operations

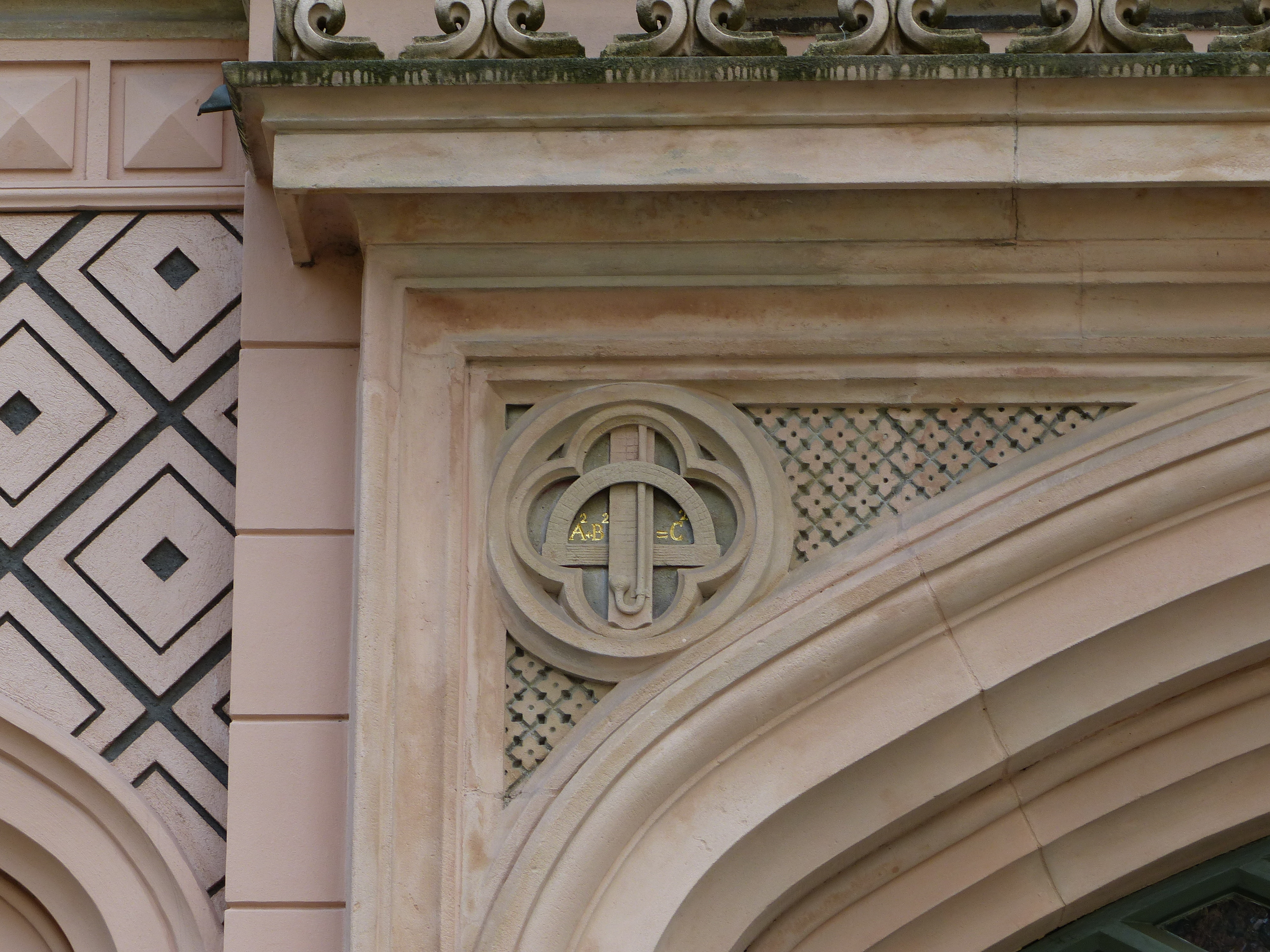
Inscription at the main door of the historical school of the master builder in Zittau.

A master builder or master mason is a central figure leading construction projects in pre-modern times (a combination of a modern expert carpenter, construction site supervisor, and architect / engineer).

Historically, the term has generally referred to "the head of a construction project in the Middle Ages or Renaissance period", with an 1887 source describing the status as follows:

A master builder is recognized as such, not only for his ability to rear a magnificent structure after plans prepared by the architect for his guidance, but because of his ability to comprehend those plans, and to skillfully weave together the crude materials which make up the strength, the harmony, the beauty, the stateliness of the edifice which grow in his hands from a made foundation to a magnificent habitation.

The term has also been applied to more broadly include "designers and builders of large-scale construction work who learned their trade in a more formal way than the builders of primitive forms in pre-technological societies... from the times of the Egyptians and Sumerians until (and in some cases beyond) the Industrial Revolution". The phrase has been in use since at least 1610, when William Camden wrote in his Britain, or a Chorographicall Description of the most flourishing Kingdomes, England, Scotland, and Ireland, and the Ilands adjoyning, out of the depth of Antiquitie of "those Wings in Architecture, which the great Master builders terme pteromata". Later in the same work, Camden writes:

And Peter is as sure a gate, for them to passe thereby. This is a rocke remaining firme: a Master builder hee...

Like other trades, master builders were initially trained through lengthy apprenticeships to persons already having that status, often beginning in boyhood, and the "secrets of the Master Builders were often jealously guarded, and treated as sacred knowledge". A 1926 source stated:

To become a Master Builder an architect must not only be possessed of the theoretical knowledge of engineering and a knowledge of the details of building construction, but he must become the devisor of methods of construction.
