= Factors Walk =

Street in Savannah, Georgia

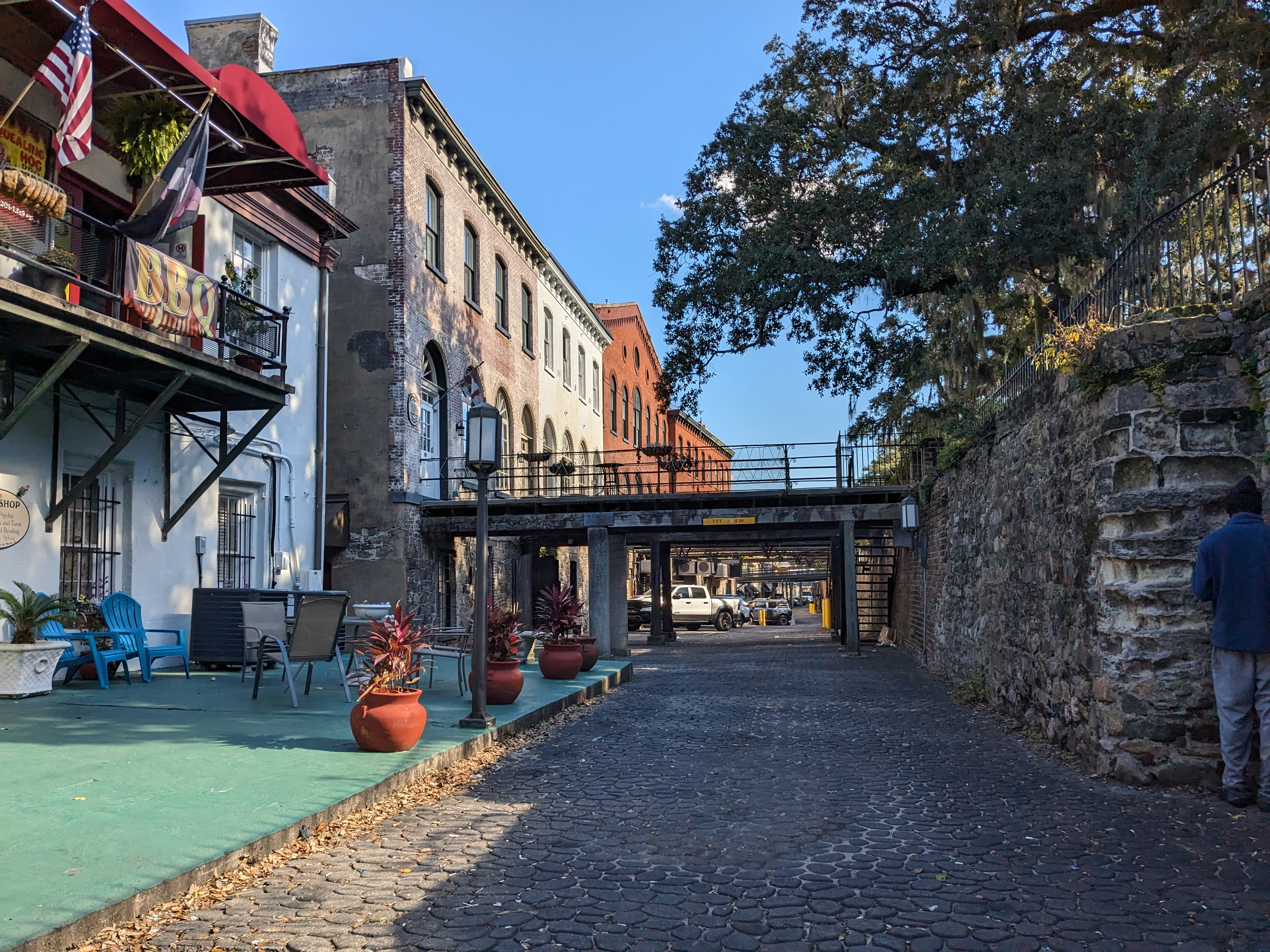
- A section of Factors Walk, looking east, near Emmet Park
- Length: 0.4 mi (0.64 km)
- Location: Savannah, Georgia, U.S.
- West end: Barnard Street
- East end: East Broad Street

Construction
- Completion: c. 1810

Factors Walk, also commonly spelled Factor's Walk or Factors' Walk, is a historic street in Savannah, Georgia, United States. It runs for about 0.4 miles (0.64 km) along the upper levels of the southern frontages of the buildings of Factors Row, which is located between River Street to the north and Bay Street, around 40 feet (12 m) above on the bluff, to the south. Although this difference in elevation was advantageous in terms of defense, it did not provide easy movement between the working waterfront and the city above.

In certain aspects, Factors Walk can be considered a harbinger to the formation of River Street, which it pre-dates by a generation. Once River Street began to develop, in the mid-19th century, its numerous wharves and the inconsistent shapes of the buildings facing the Savannah River made traversing along the thoroughfare difficult, especially on its busiest days. Thus, Factors Walk evolved as a much more free-flowing passageway for factors and business owners to utilize.

Initially used by delivery wagons, with horse sheds existing at select points, it was developed into two levels, with pedestrian gangways and other structures connecting Factors Row, above, to Bay Street, to prevent workers and vendors having to descend to Factors Walk. Perpendicular ramps were constructed down through Factors Walk to River Street from the north–south–running Barnard, Abercorn, Lincoln and East Broad Streets, which provided access to and from the downtown. Initially straight, several of the ramps were curved during work done in the 1850s.

== Etymology ==
A factor is a type of trader who receives and sells goods on commission. In most cases in Savannah, the goods were King Cotton.

== Retaining wall and ramps ==
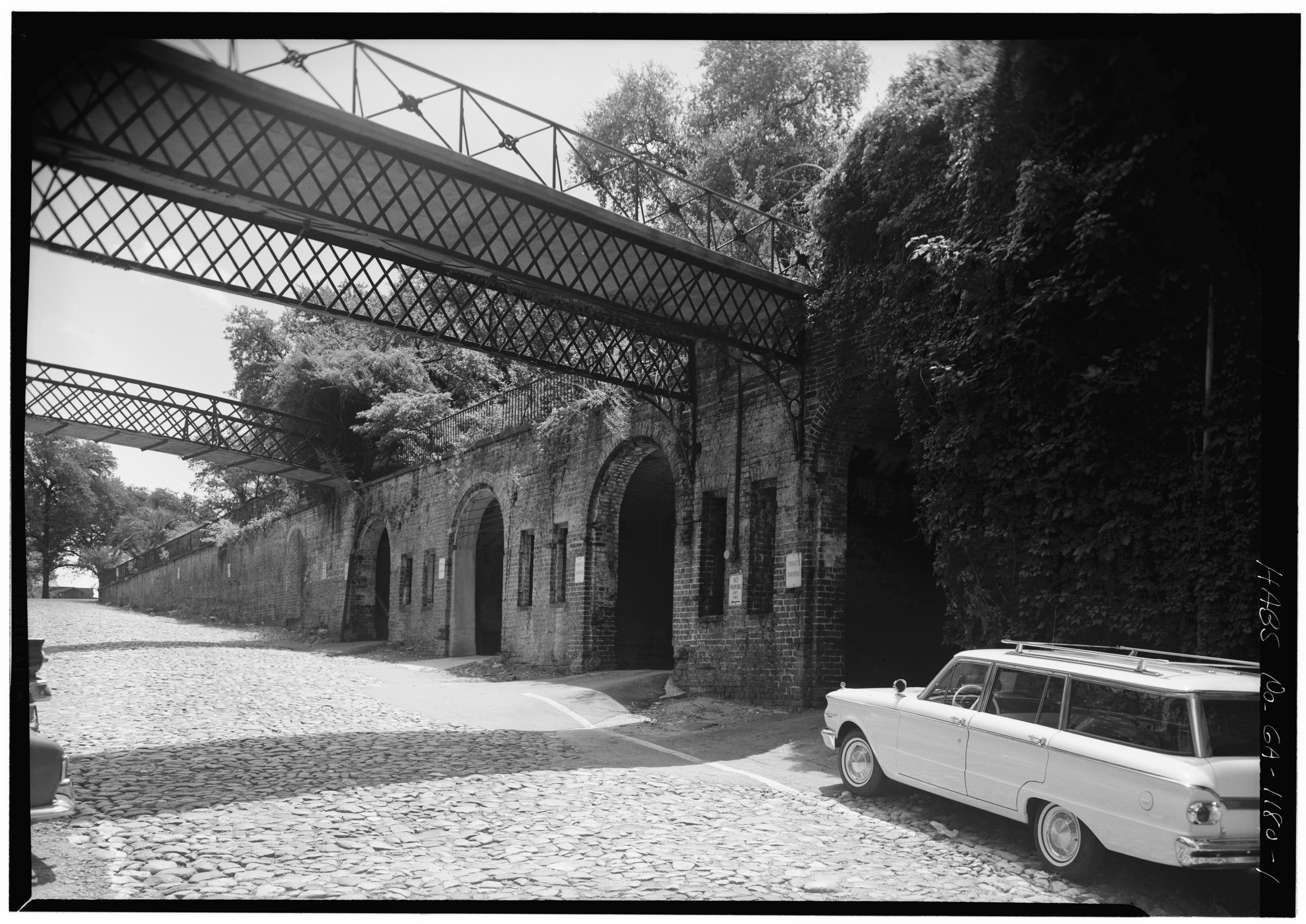
The Cluskey Embankment Stores, pictured around 1980

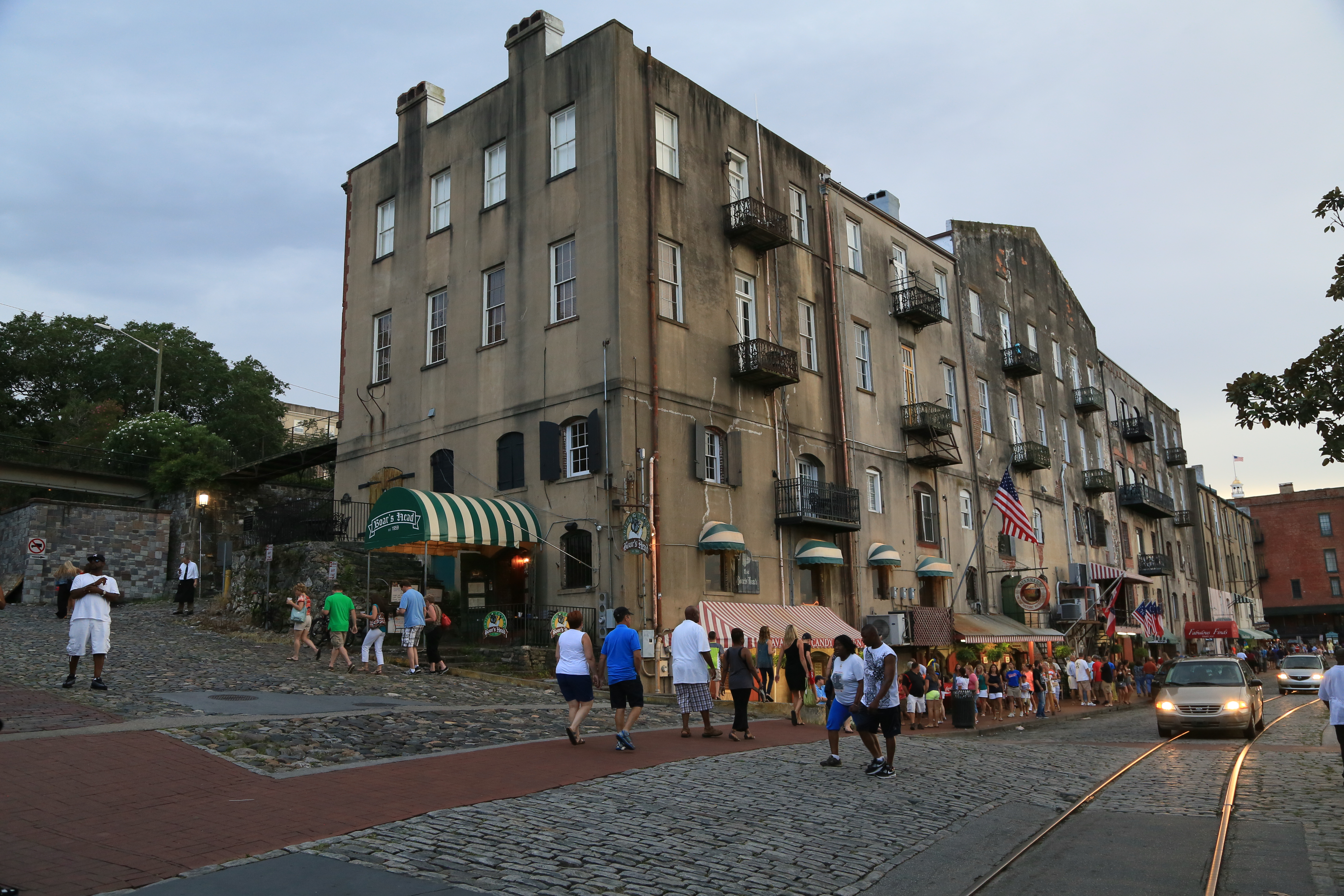
The Lincoln Street Ramp at its River Street terminus between the Lower Stoddard Range (in view) and the Scott and Balfour Stores, 2017

Between 1840 and 1844, east of Savannah City Hall, a series of vaults, known as the Cluskey Embankment Stores (named for architect Charles B. Cluskey), were built into an earlier brick wall.

In 1854, stonemason Michael Cash (1833–1880), an immigrant from the Irish village of Blackwater, County Wexford, began building part of today's ballast-stone retaining wall, which runs a course of 0.75 miles (1.21 km) and averages 19 feet (5.8 m) in height. Its purpose was to provide access to the waterfront while also preventing erosion of the bluff.

Cash began with the Lincoln Ramp in 1854.

During construction of the Barnard Street wall, on August 2, 1856, 30-year-old George Rankin fell to his death, not having realized that building work had begun. He was carrying out a paper route for his sick son, and was discovered "quite dead after daylight" the following morning. He had broken his neck.

In 1857, the city council contracted John Scudder, builder of many homes around Savannah, to link the Lincoln Ramp walls with those at East Broad Street. The work was delayed by a labor strike, however.

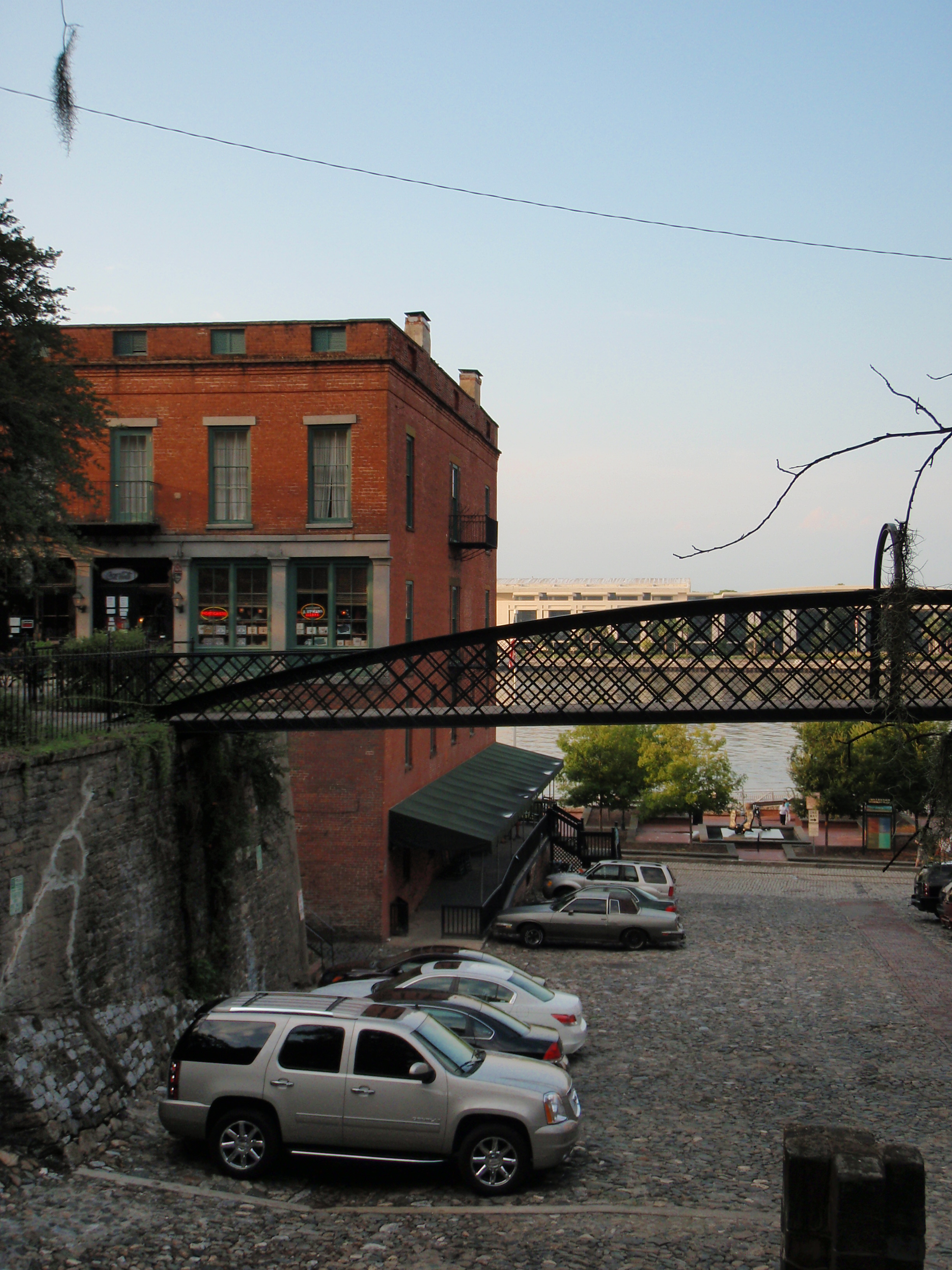
A pedestrian bridge above the Abercorn Ramp

Much of the wall was built by 1858, but it was not completed until 1869, with final work being the Lincoln Ramp's inner slip.

Part of the Abercorn Ramp collapsed in 1868.

In the retaining walls of today's ramps are stone carvings denoting the mayor who authorized the work. In most cases it was Edward Clifford Anderson. Michael Cash was responsible for the walls that run from Barnard to East Broad Streets.

The surfaces of the ramps leading to and from River Street were repaved from 1866 and thereafter.

== Architecture ==
The following buildings, while having frontages on Bay Street, have businesses working out of their River Street elevations. Ordered from west to east.

West River Street

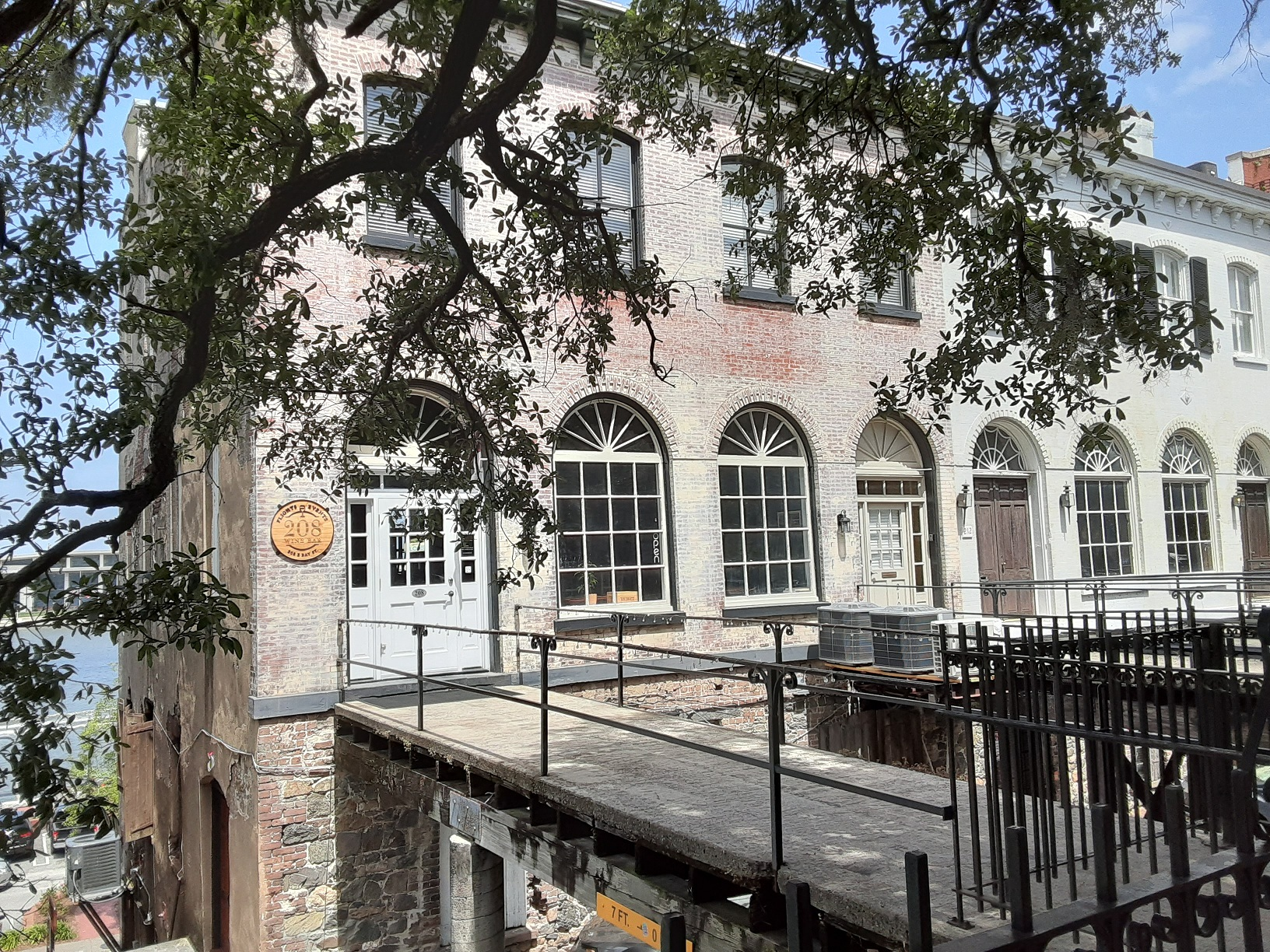
Gangways crossing above Factors Walk, connecting Bay Street to Factors Row, in the Lower Stoddard Range, 2021

- John Williamson Range, 302–310 West Bay Street
- 220–224 West Bay Street
- Lowden Building, 214 West Bay Street
- William Taylor Stores, 202–206 West Bay Street
- Jones and Telfair Range, 112–130 West Bay Street
- Hyatt Regency Savannah, 2 West Bay Street

East River Street

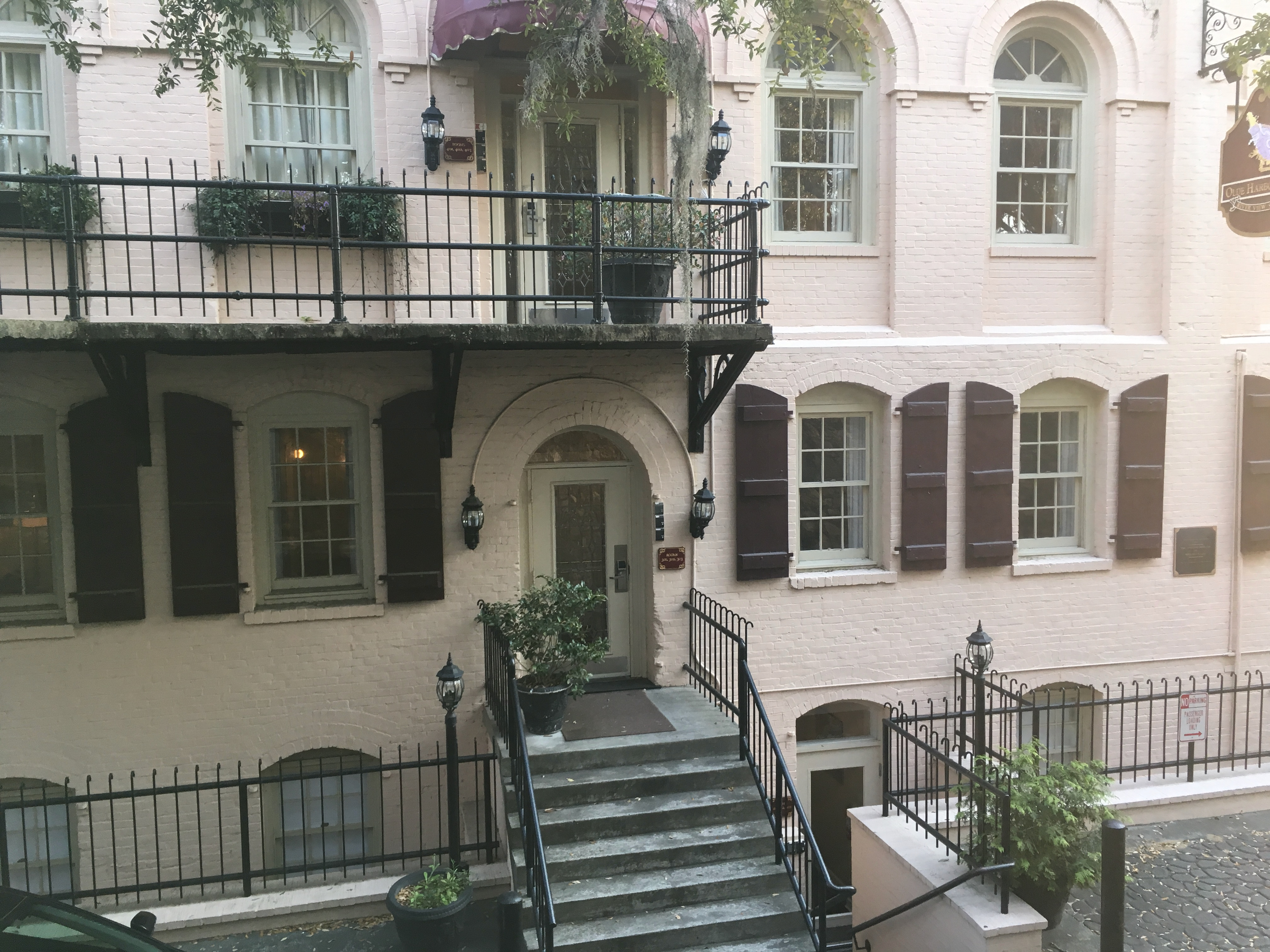
Steps up to Olde Harbour Inn from Factors Walk

- Thomas Gamble Building, 4–10 East Bay Street
- Upper Stoddard Range, 12–42 East Bay Street
- Claghorn and Cunningham Range, 102–110 East Bay Street
- Jones/Derenne Range, 112–130 East Bay Street
- Archibald Smith Stores, 202–206 East Bay Street
- Lower Stoddard Range, 208–230 East Bay Street
- Scott and Balfour Stores, 302–316 East Bay Street
- George Anderson Stores, 402–410 East Bay Street
- Olde Harbour Inn, 508 East Bay Street

The Savannah Cotton Exchange, at 100 East Bay Street, only has a ramp entrance/exit at its rear. As late as 1857, Drayton Street had a ramp down to the river, but the route was later walled off, preventing access from Bay Street. Claghorn and Cunningham had petitioned the city council to erect a wall at the foot of the street to prevent the flow of sand down from the bluff which would impede their building plans.

A ramp also formerly exited Whitaker Street and led down to the river. In 1887, Wilcox and Gibbs Guano Company, which owned the old Commerce Row buildings to the east, received permission to tear up the stretch of Factors Walk that passed in front of their properties.
