= Claghorn and Cunningham Range =

Historic building in Georgia

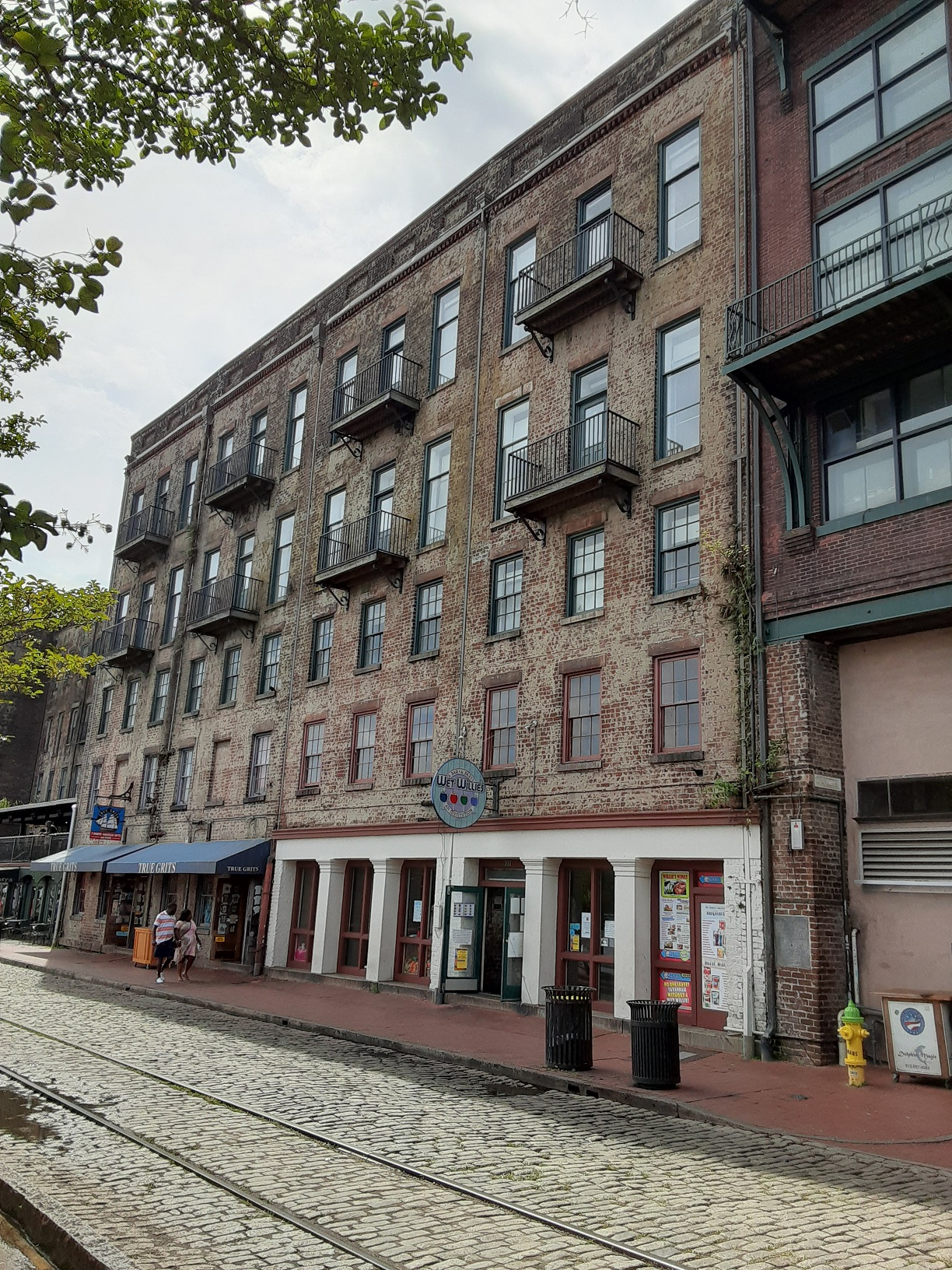
- The rear of the range, on River Street, in 2021
- Interactive map of the Claghorn and Cunningham Range area

General information
- Location: 102–110 East Bay Street, Savannah, Georgia, United States
- Coordinates: 32.08117°N 81.0896°W
- Completed: 1857 (169 years ago)

Technical details
- Floor count: 5

Claghorn and Cunningham Range is a historic range of buildings in Savannah, Georgia, United States. Located in Savannah's Historic District, the addresses of some of the properties are East Bay Street, above Factors Walk, while others solely utilize the former King Cotton warehouses on River Street. As of February 2022, the businesses occupying the ground floor of the River Street elevation are True Grits and Wet Willie's.

The building's construction, completed in 1857 in tandem with the adjacent (to the east) Jones and Derenne Range, is attributed to Charles Sholl and Calvin Fay. Savannah Cotton Exchange, adjacent to the west, was built in 1887, thirty years after the Claghorn and Cunningham Range.

During the Civil War, Claghorn and Cunningham was a chandlery.

In 1887, Claghorn and Cunningham, wholesalers, wrote a letter of reference in a Yulee vs. Canova lawsuit in the Supreme Court of Florida:

Messrs. Smith & Ives:

Gents: We have bought sugar here lately within a week at $4.50 to $5, and about two months ago at $3.50, which is the range of the market, and are now retailing at $6 per pound.

Very truly yours,

Claghorn & Company

== River Street façade ==
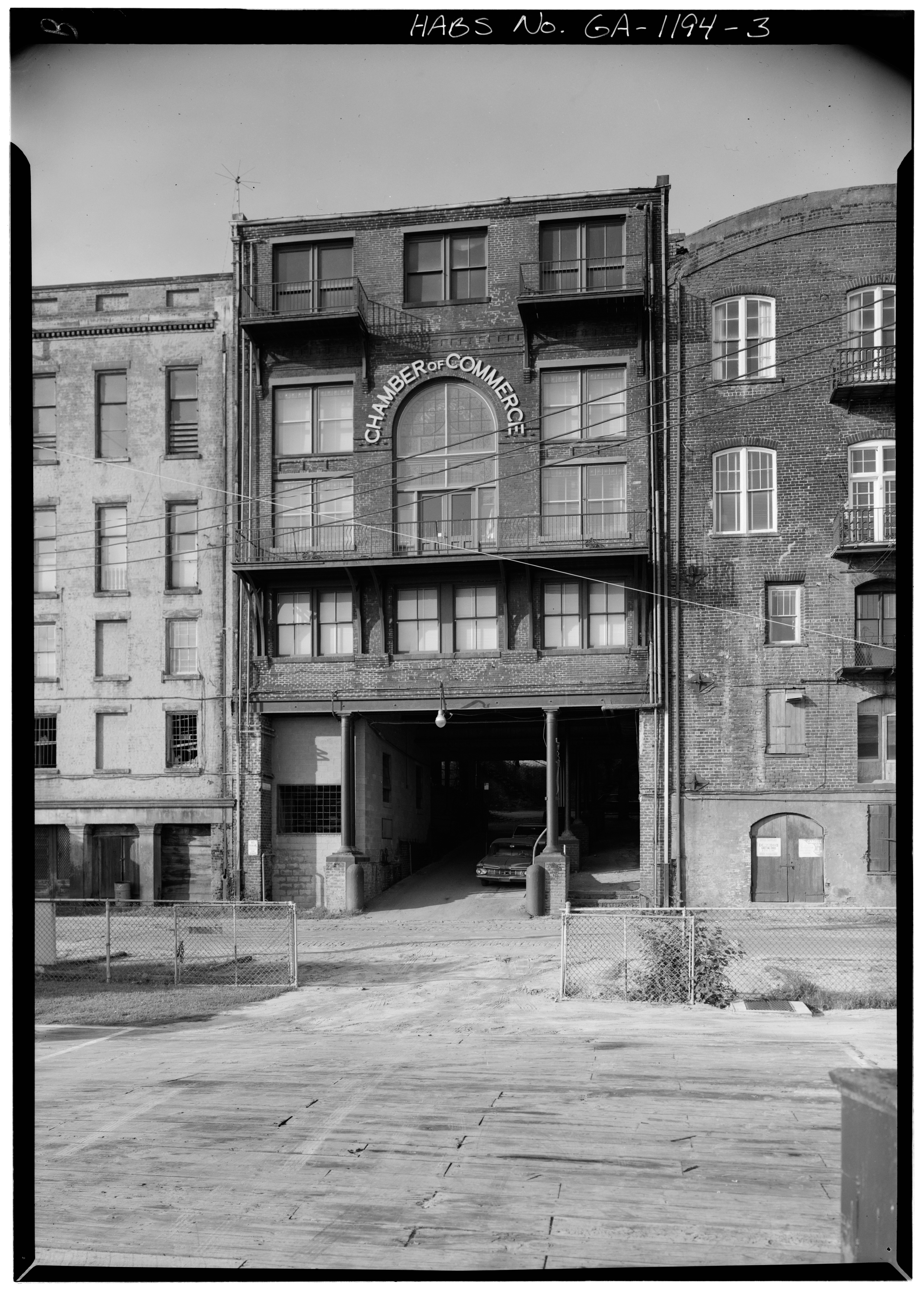
A 1930s view of the rear of the former home of Savannah's Chamber of Commerce (now the Savannah Cotton Exchange), whose frontage is at 100 East Bay Street

== See also ==
- Buildings in Savannah Historic District
