= Sholl & Fay =

Architectural firm of Charles Sholl and Calvin Fay

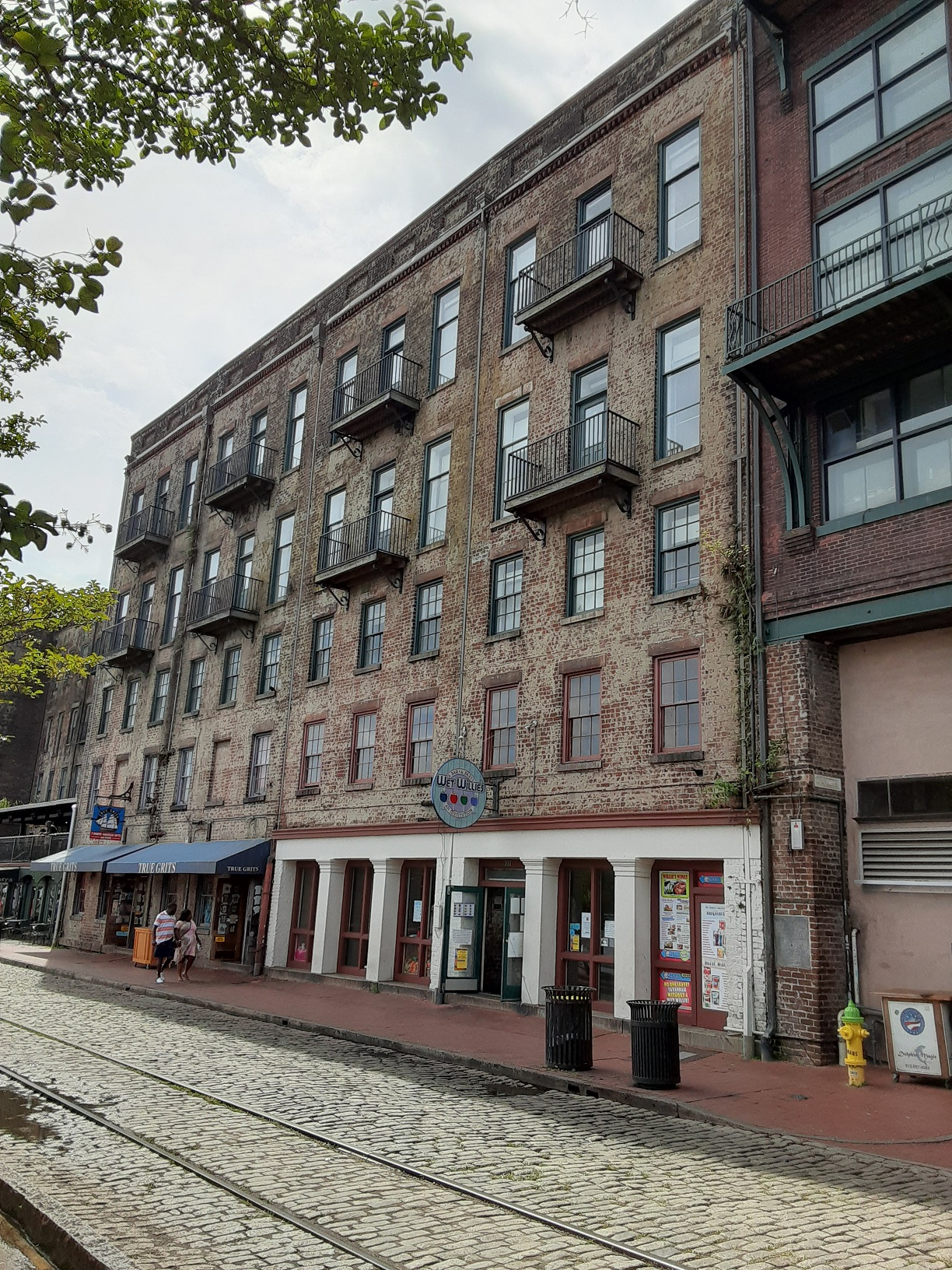
- 102–110 East Bay Street, in Savannah, Georgia, was the work of Sholl & Fay in 1857

Practice information
- Key architects: Charles Sholl; Calvin Fay
- Founded: 1852
- Dissolved: 1857 (168 years ago)
- Location: Savannah, Georgia, United States

Significant works and honors
- Buildings: 124 East Bay Street, Savannah (1857); 102–110 East Bay Street, Savannah (1857)

Sholl & Fay was the architectural firm of Charles Sholl and Calvin Fay which was active in the 19th century. The partnership existed between 1852 and 1857. They were responsible for the renovations of the City Exchange, Savannah Medical College and several Italianate buildings in Savannah, Georgia, where they were based.

In 1855, they were in discussions regarding potential renovations at the Georgia State House. They submitted sketches and an estimate for completion of between $125,000 and $150,000. It is not known whether they undertook the renovations.

Fay went on to be a partner with another Georgia architect, Alfred Eichberg, between 1881 and 1888.

== Notable works ==
- Jones and Telfair Range, 112–130 West Bay Street, Savannah, Georgia (1852–1854) – now the Cotton Sail Hotel
- Louisa Porter Home, 23 East Charlton Street, Savannah, Georgia (1853)
- City Exchange, Bay Street (1854) – portico (building now demolished; replaced in 1905 by today's Savannah City Hall
- Powell Building, Central State Hospital, Milledgeville, Georgia (1856)
- Claghorn and Cunningham Range, 102–110 East Bay Street, Savannah, Georgia (1857)
- Jones/Derenne Range, 124 East Bay Street, Savannah, Georgia (1857) – now River Street Inn

== Gallery ==
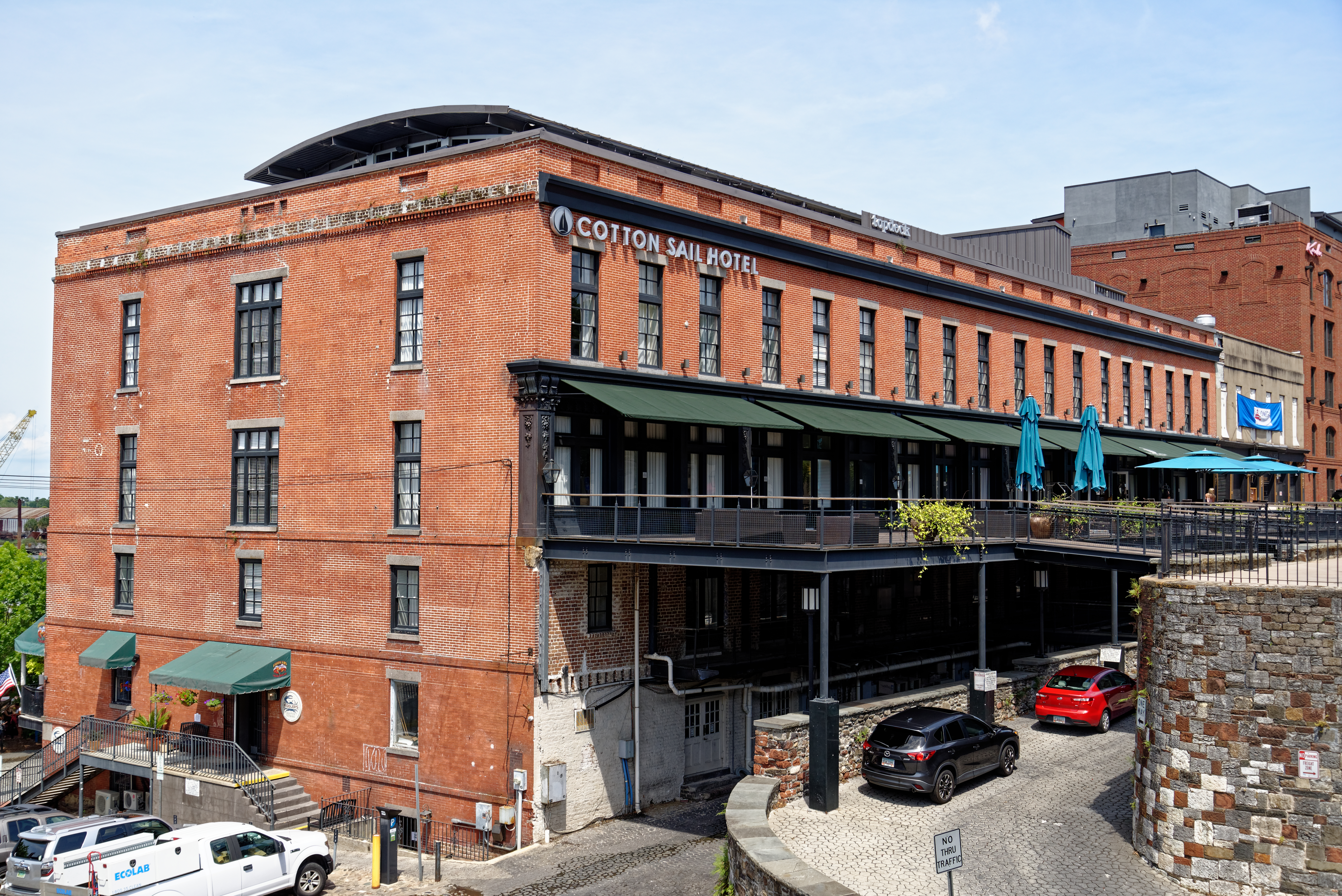
112–130 West Bay Street, Savannah

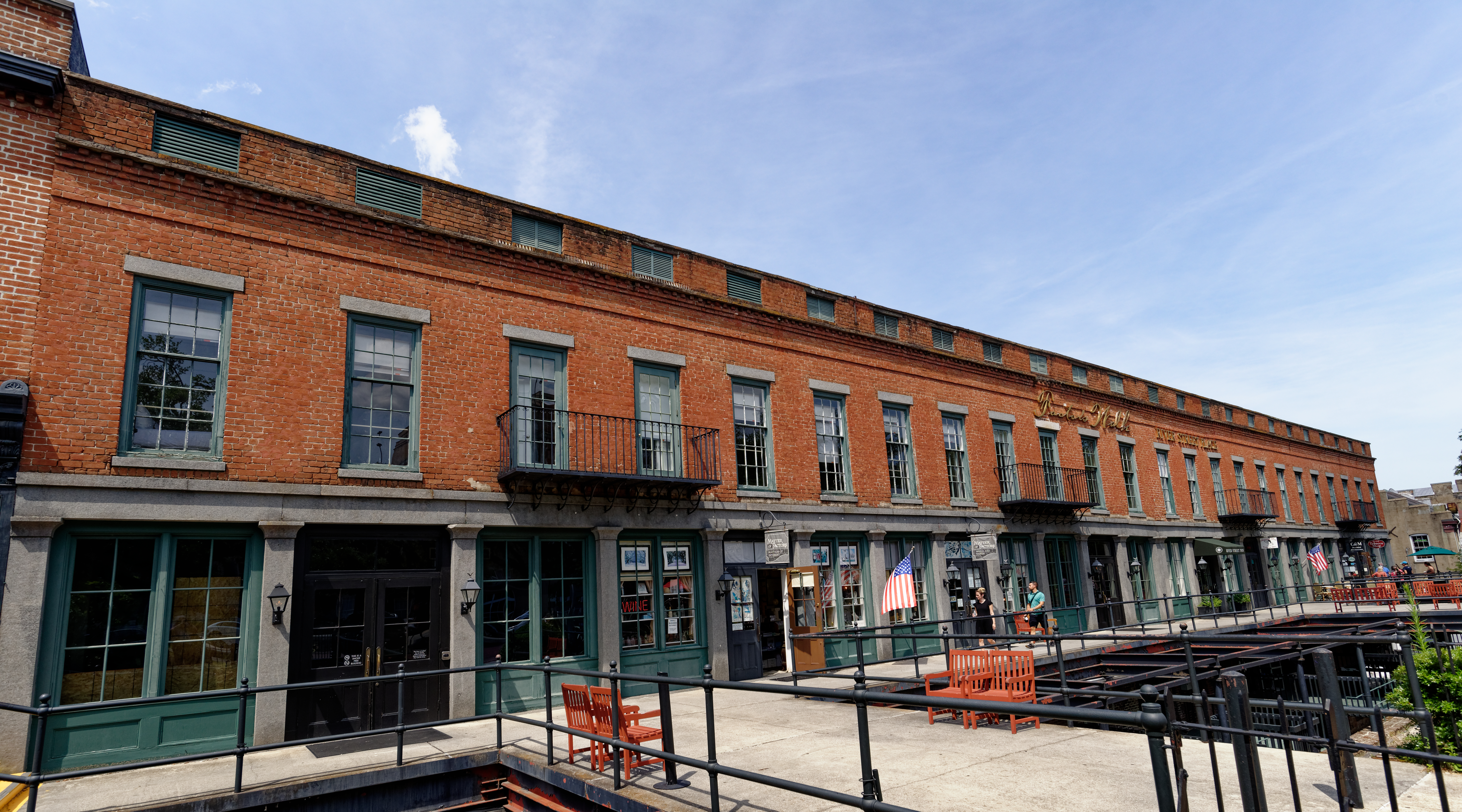
102–110 East Bay Street, Savannah
