= Thomas Gamble Building =

Historic building in Georgia

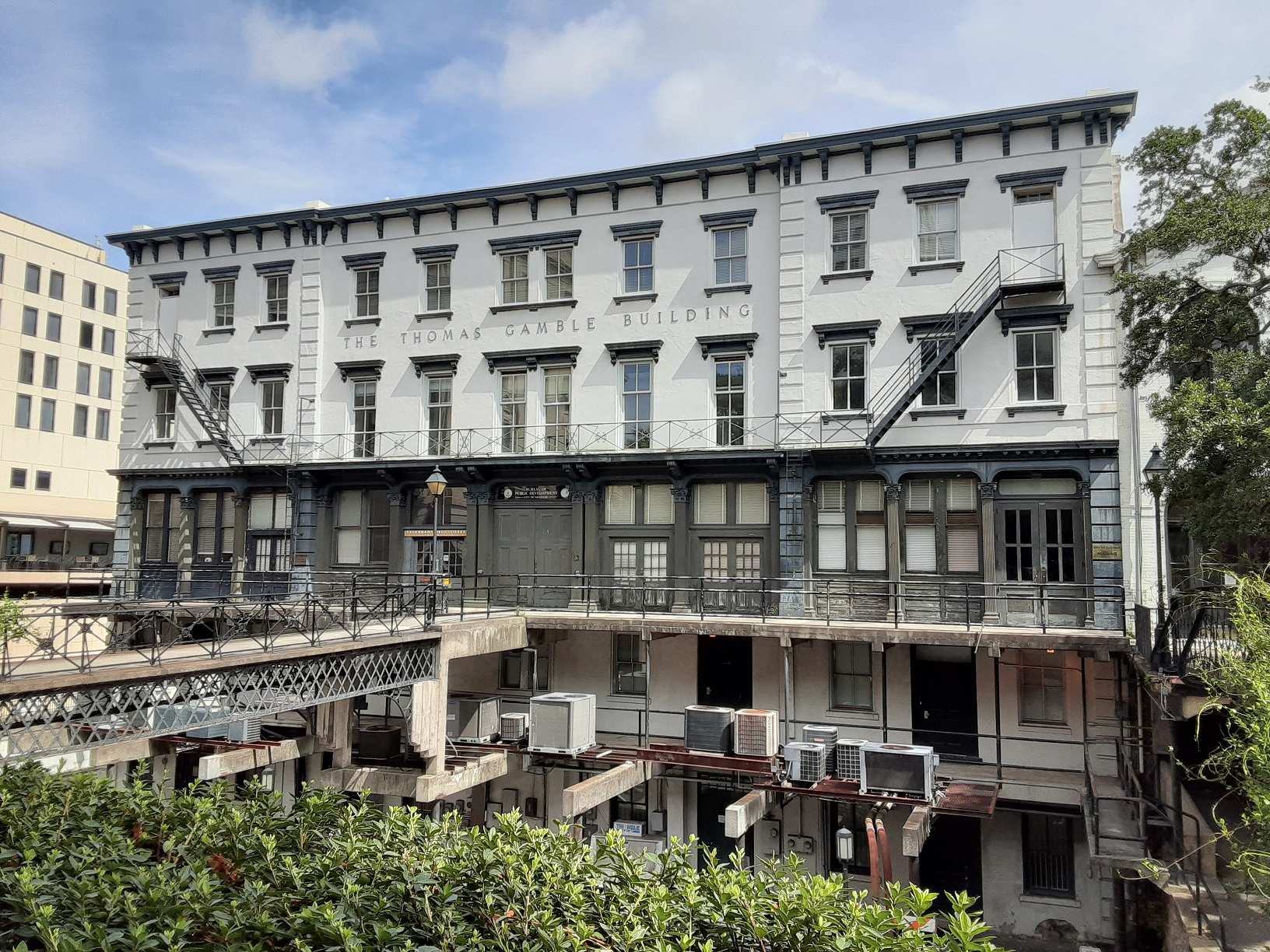
- The building in 2021, viewed from East Bay Street
- Interactive map of the Thomas Gamble Building area

General information
- Location: 4–10 East Bay Street, Savannah, Georgia, United States
- Coordinates: 32.08133°N 81.0907°W
- Completed: 1877 (149 years ago)

Technical details
- Floor count: 5–6

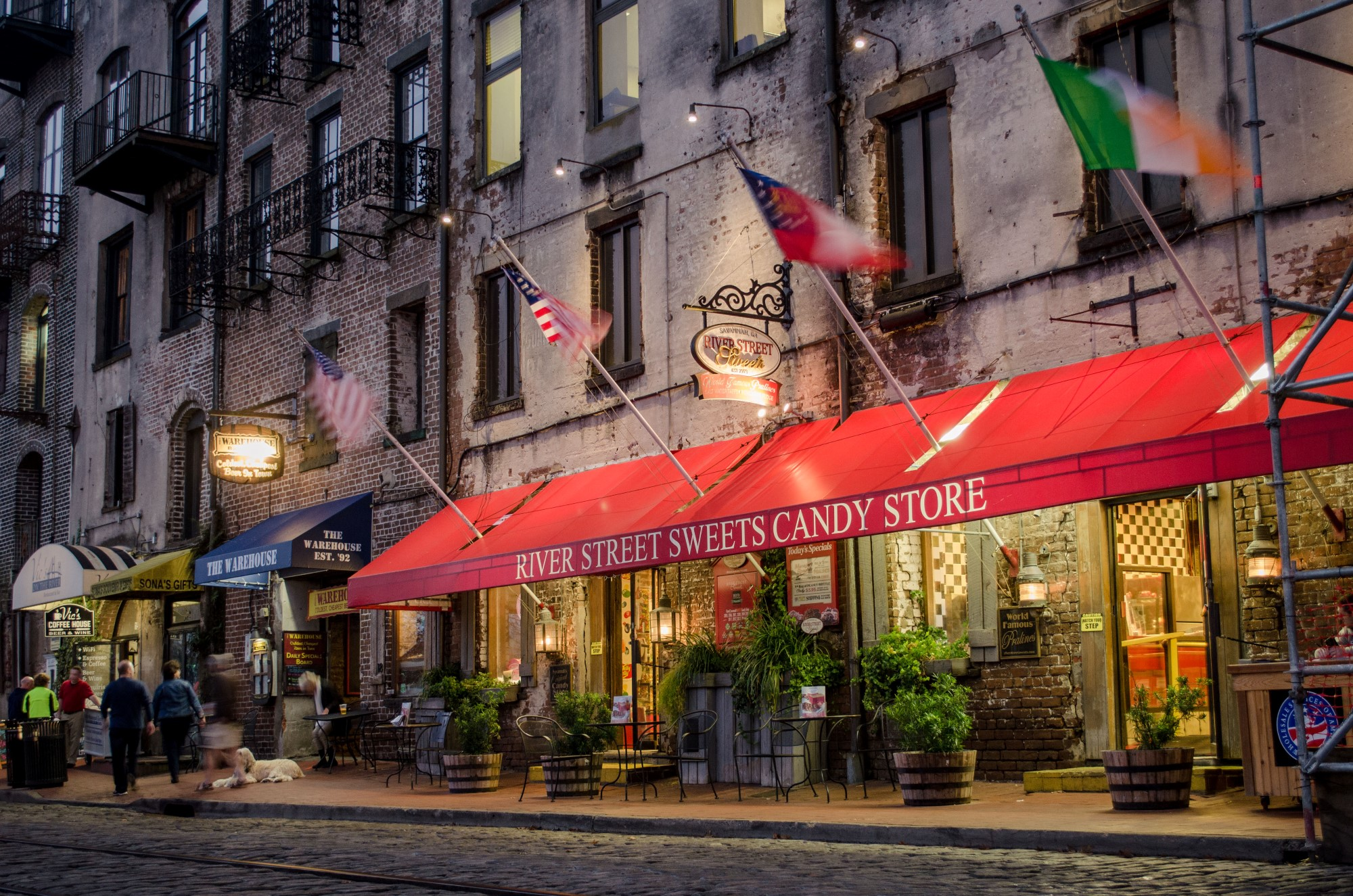
River Street elevation

The Thomas Gamble Building, formerly known as the Eugene Kelly Stores, Kelly's Block and Kelly's Building, is a historic building in Savannah, Georgia, United States. Located in Savannah's Historic District, between Upper Stoddard Range to the east, Savannah City Hall to the south and the Hyatt Regency Savannah to the west, the addresses of some of the properties are East Bay Street, above Factors Walk, while Olympia Cafe occupies the former King Cotton warehouses on the River Street elevation. Olympia's owner, Nick Pappas, died in 2025, after which the city decided not to renew the business's lease. A petition to save the business gained over 3,500 signatures.

The building was constructed in 1877, by W. G. Butler, replacing the 1869 Eugene Kelly Stores, designed by Muller & Bruyn but which burned in 1876. Shortly after the fire, Kelly, a millionaire from New York, stated that he intended to rebuild, naming it "Kelly's Stores 2". To match the Bay Street frontage, the River Street façade was given a stucco finish in 1883, under the supervision of Bernard Goode.

Several prominent Savannah companies were located in Kelly's Block for many years, including the John Flannery Co., which moved into the building upon its rebuilding was completed in 1877. Purse Printing & Paper Co. occupied space in the property for over sixty years.

After the death of Kelly in 1894, his family maintained the property until 1907, at which point it was sold to New York's Temple Court Company, owned by Eugene's son, Thomas Hughes Kelly.

The Temple Court Company sold the rear half of Wharf Lot 9, which contained the structure of Kelly's Block. Thomas rented another part of the building to the City of Savannah, before selling the entire building to the city in June 1943.

The building was renamed in 1945 for Thomas Gamble, Savannah's mayor between 1933 and 1937 and 1938 until his death in 1945.

== See also ==
- Buildings in Savannah Historic District
