= Bay Street (Savannah, Georgia) =

Prominent street in Savannah, Georgia

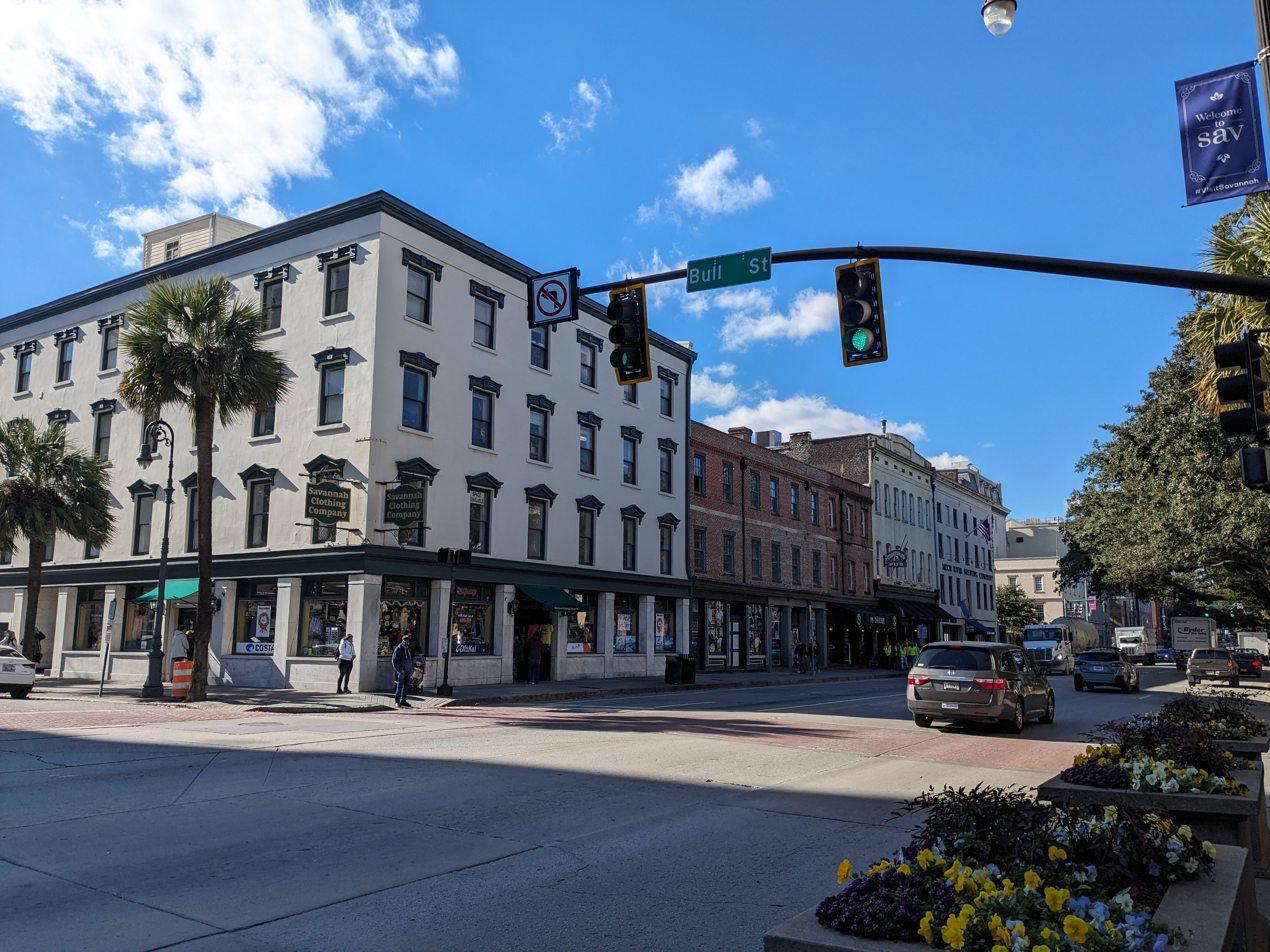
- Buildings on the southern side of West Bay Street
- Former name: North Broad Street
- Length: 3.65 mi (5.87 km)
- Location: Savannah, Georgia, U.S.
- West end: Main Street
- East end: General McIntosh Boulevard

Bay Street is a prominent street in Savannah, Georgia, United States. It runs for about 3.65 miles (5.87 km) from Main Street in the west to General McIntosh Boulevard in the east. The section passing through Savannah's downtown, between the Bay Street Viaduct in the west and General McIntosh Boulevard in the east, is around 1.2 miles (1.9 km) long.

Formerly known as "Bay Street" singular (and originally North Broad Street), it is now denoted as "West Bay Street" and "East Bay Street", the split occurring at Savannah City Hall at the head of Bull Street.

West Bay Street begins in the industrial western side of the city, where it is part of U.S. Route 80, then Georgia State Route 25 (before turning south onto Martin Luther King Jr. Boulevard), then continues along the northern end of Savannah's downtown, where it is lined with historic buildings on its southern side and businesses and a park on its northern side, which is at the edge of the bluff.

East of City Hall, the northern side of the street is known as The Strand, punctuated by Emmet Park a few yards west of where East River Street merges with East Bay Street.

== Downtown Savannah ==
The street runs parallel to the Savannah River, and around 40 feet (12 m) above River Street, a few yards to the north, for most of its downtown section.

=== Intersections ===
Bay Street has intersections with the below streets in its downtown section (from west to east), either side of Bull Street:

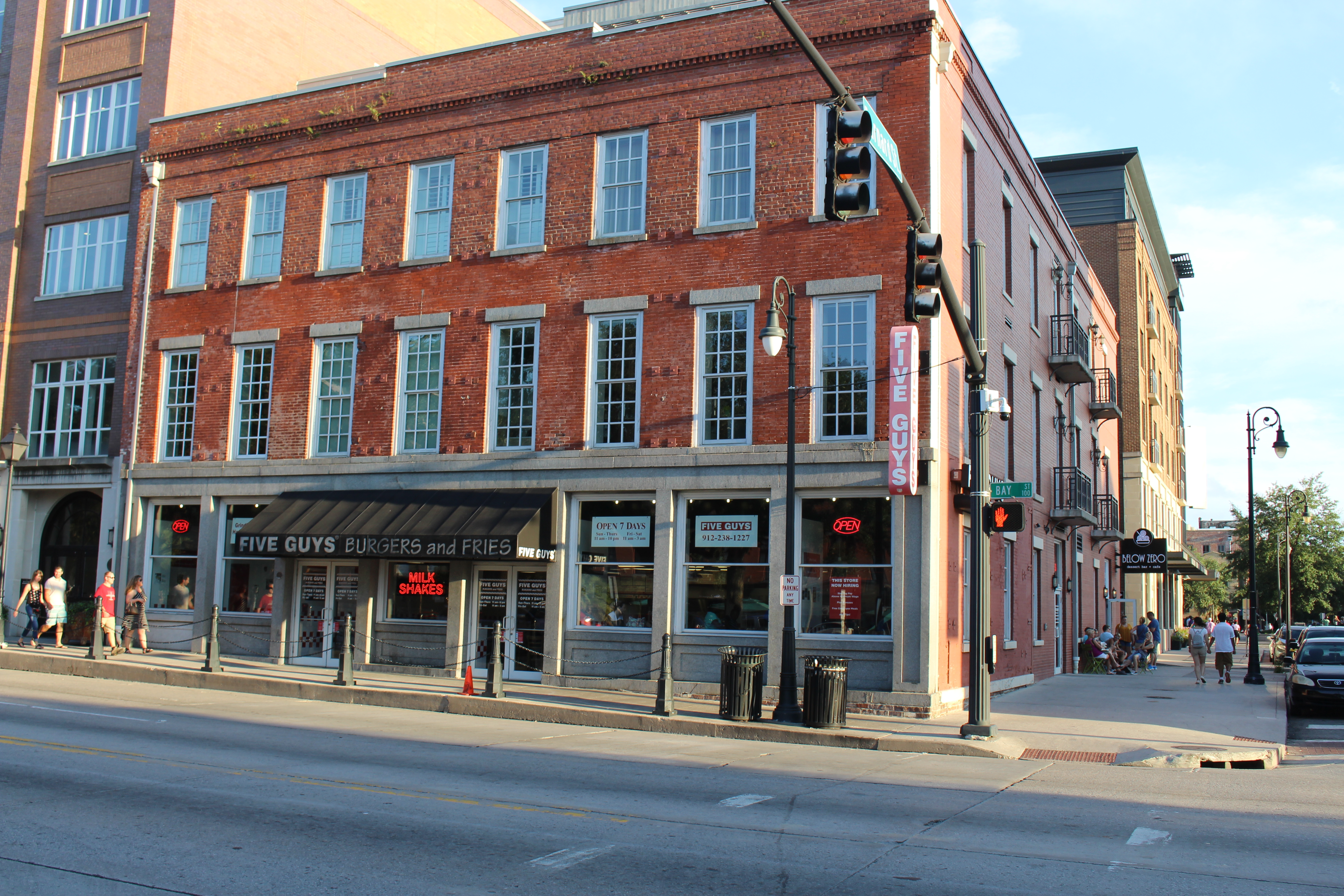
175 West Bay Street, at Barnard Street

West Bay Street

- Fahm Street (cross street)
- Ann Street
- Martin Luther King Jr. Boulevard (cross street)
- Montgomery Street (cross street)
- Jefferson Street
- Williamson Street
- Barnard Street (including a ramp to River Street through Factors Walk)
- Whitaker Street

East Bay Street

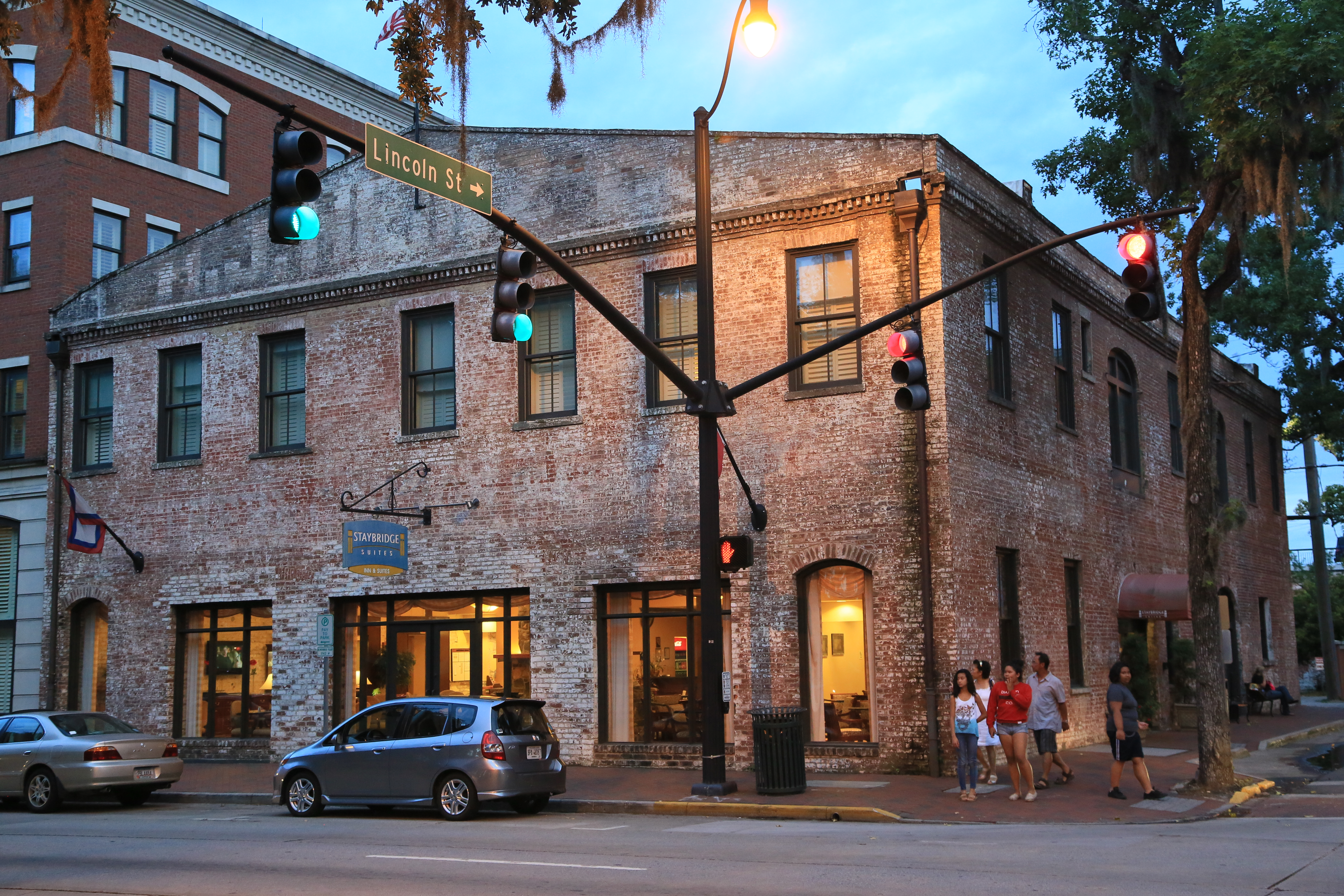
301 East Bay Street, at Lincoln Street, built for Edward Padelford in 1851

- Drayton Street
- Abercorn Street (including a ramp to River Street)
- Lincoln Street (including a ramp to River Street)
- Habersham Street
- Price Street
- Houston Street
- Rossiter Place
- East Broad Street (including a ramp to River Street)
- East River Street

== St. Patrick's Day ==
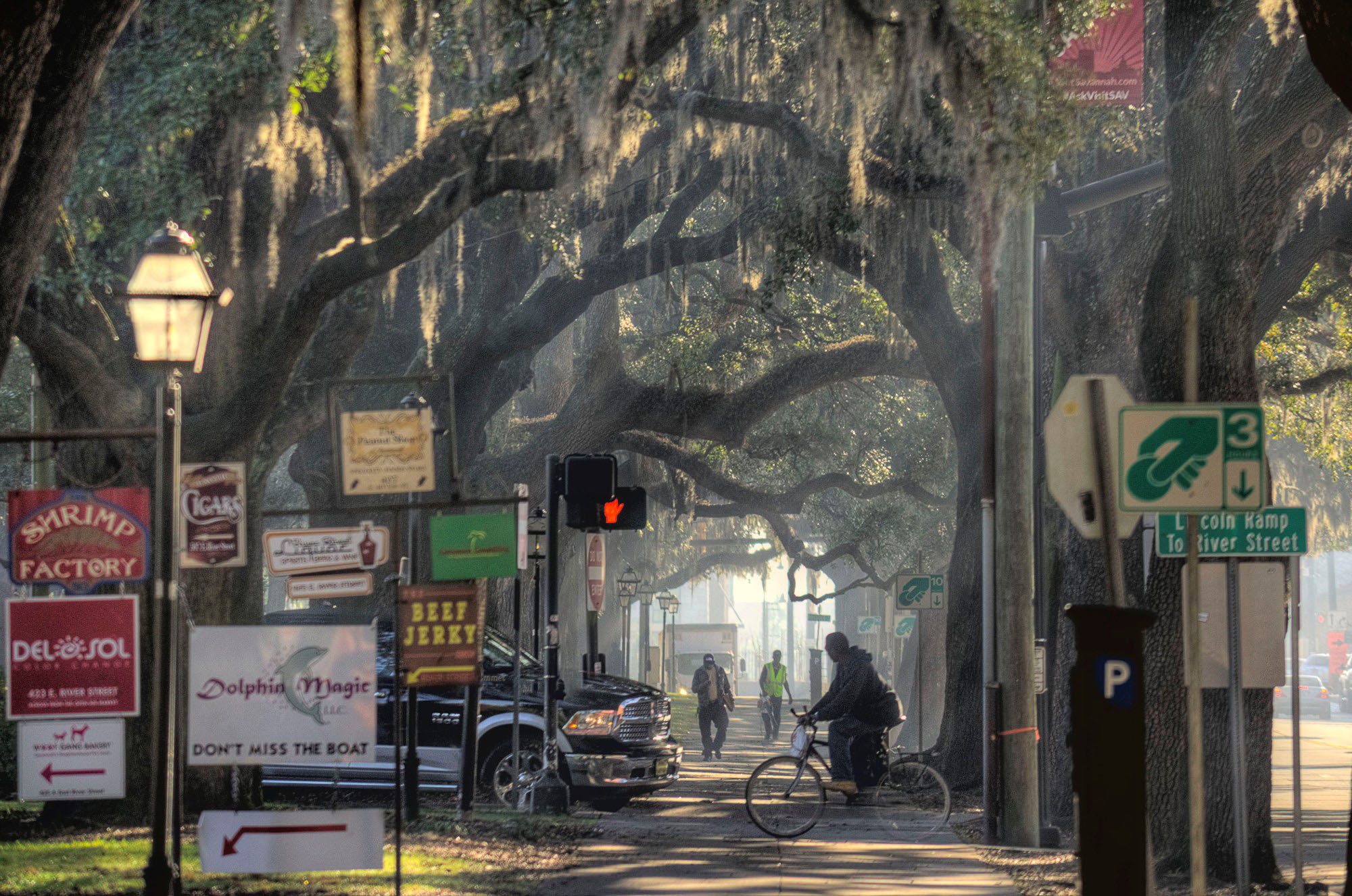
Looking west along Bay Street's northern sidewalk from the Lincoln Street Ramp at Emmet Park

In March 2001, the crowds attending the annual St. Patrick's Day celebrations in Savannah spilled over onto Bay Street after police closed River Street's festival entrances. This led to the closure of Bay Street to traffic around 11:15 pm out of concern for public safety. The following year, the city made the section of Bay Street between Martin Luther King Jr. Boulevard and Price Street pedestrian-only for the event.

== Notable buildings and structures ==
Below is a selection of notable buildings and structures on Bay Street, all in Savannah's Historic District. From west to east:

Northern side

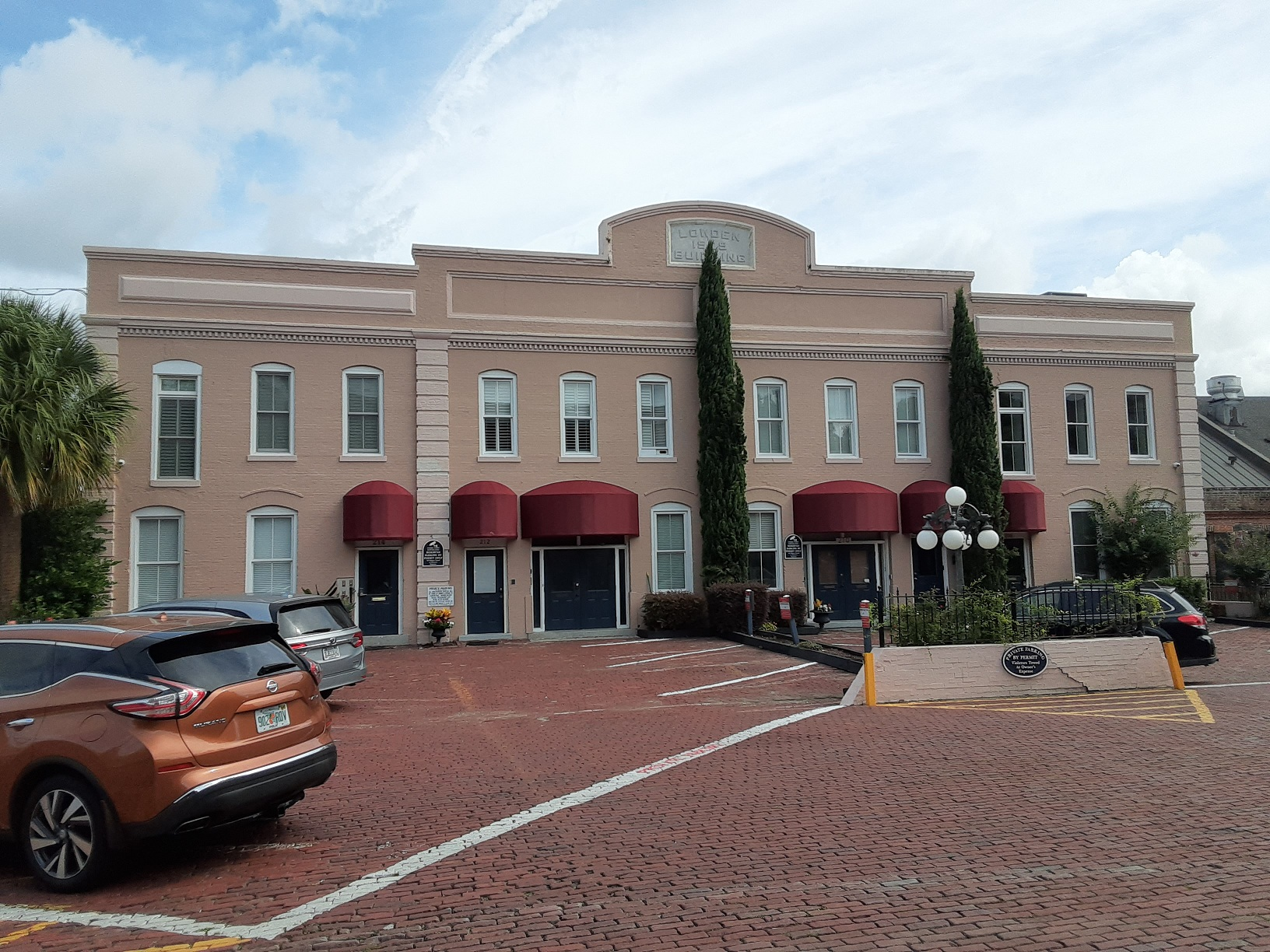
Lowden Building, 214 West Bay Street

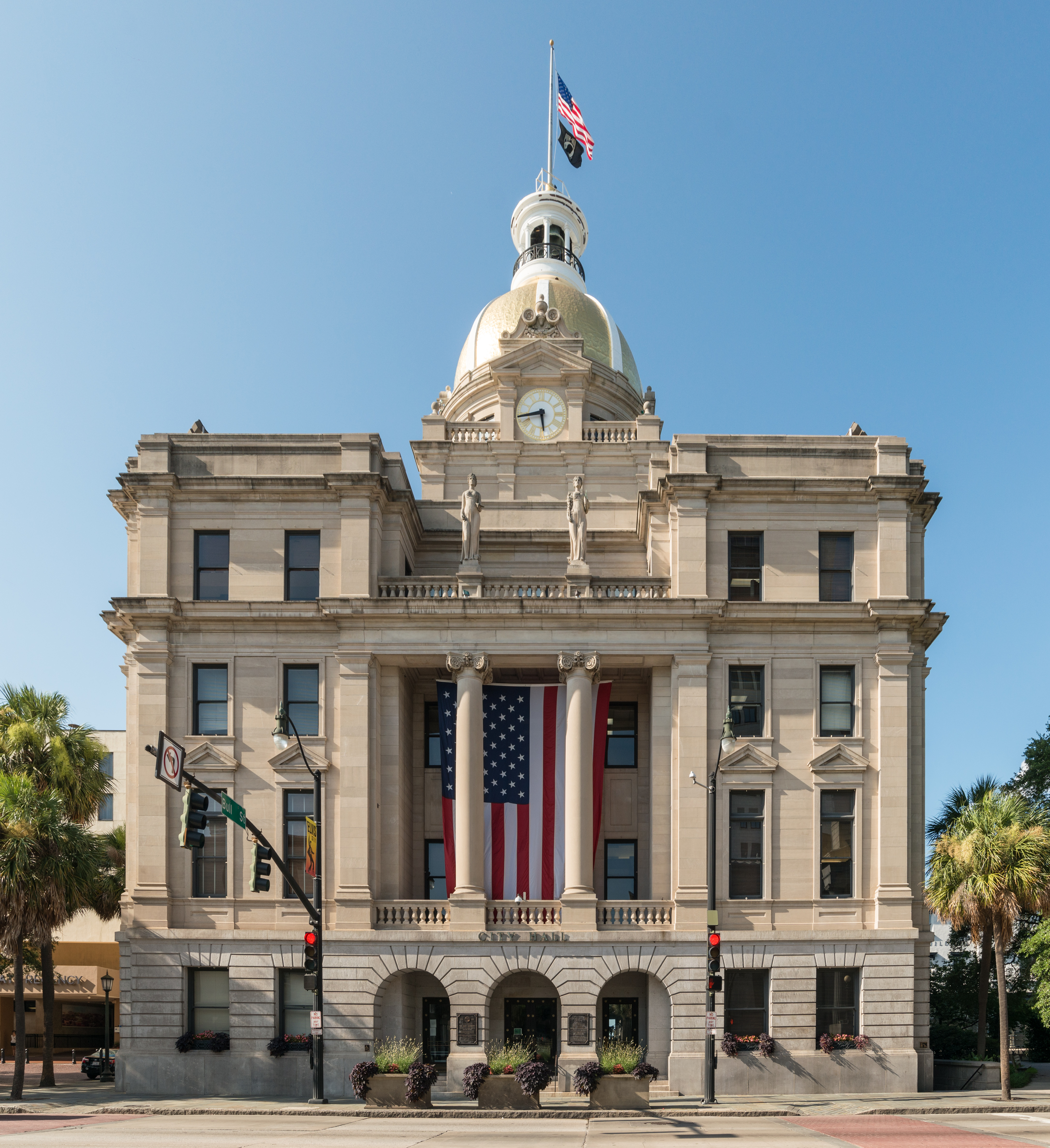
Savannah City Hall, viewed from Bull Street

- John Williamson Range, 302–310 West Bay Street (1819)
- Johnston Range, 220–230 West Bay Street (1823)
- Lowden Building, 214 West Bay Street (1910)
- William Taylor Stores, 202–206 West Bay Street (1806/1818)
- Jones and Telfair Range, 112–130 West Bay Street (1852–1854)
- Hyatt Regency Savannah, 2 West Bay Street (1980)
- Savannah City Hall, 2 East Bay Street (1904–1905)
- Thomas Gamble Building, 4–10 East Bay Street (1877)
- Upper Stoddard Range, 12–42 East Bay Street (1859)
- Savannah Cotton Exchange, 100 East Bay Street (1887)
- Claghorn and Cunningham Range, 102–110 East Bay Street (1857)
- Jones/Derenne Range, 112–130 East Bay Street (1857)
- Archibald Smith Stores, 202–206 East Bay Street (1810)
- Lower Stoddard Range, 208–230 East Bay Street (1858)
- Scott and Balfour Stores, 302–316 East Bay Street (1858)
- George Anderson Stores, 402–410 East Bay Street (1823/1850s)
- Olde Harbour Inn, 504–516 East Factors Walk/East Bay Street (1892)
- Emmet Park
- Old Harbor Light (1858)

Southern side

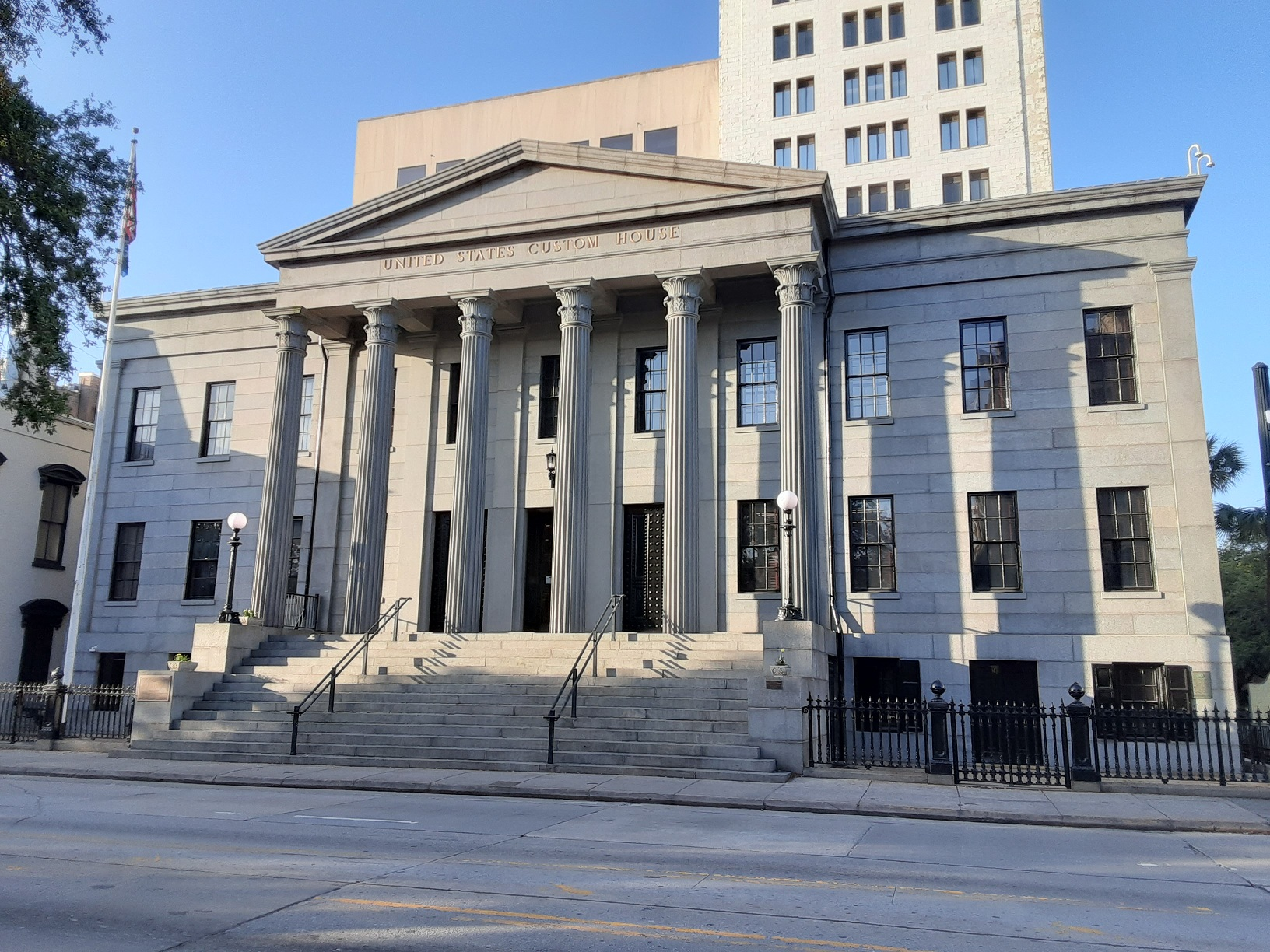
United States Customhouse

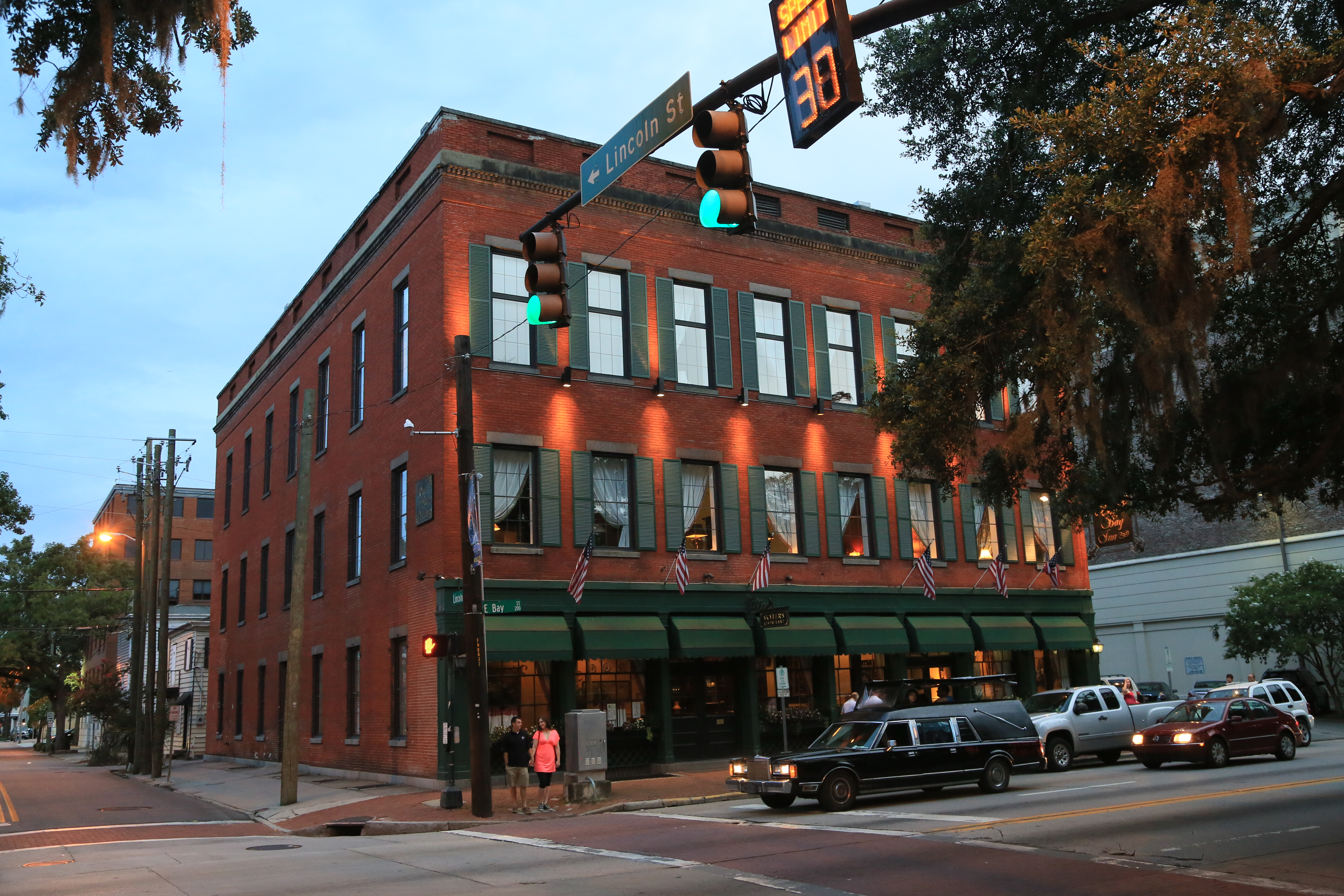
225 East Bay Street, at Lincoln Street

- Simon Guckenheimer Building, 225 West Bay Street (1893)
- George W. Jones Building, 121–123 West Bay Street (1852)
- James Johnston Building, 103 West Bay Street (1819)
- 21 West Bay Street (former City Hotel) (1821)
- Solomon Cohen Building, 17 West Bay Street (1869)
- United States Customhouse, 1–3 East Bay Street (1842–1852)
- Central Railroad Bank, 7 East Bay Street (1853)
- George Owens House, 15–17 East Bay Street (1822–1823)
- 25–27 East Bay Street (1860/1895/1915)
- Hibernia Bank Building, 101 East Bay Street (1914)
- 105–107 East Bay Street (1922)
- Oglethorpe Lodge Building, 113–119 East Bay Street (1853)
- Edward Padelford Building (west), 229–233 East Bay Street (1853–1854)
- Edward Padelford Building (east), 301 East Bay Street (1851)
- Hugh Cullen Property, 3–5 Habersham Street (at Bay Street) (1854)
- 417 East Bay Street (circa 1875)
- John Eppinger Property, 425 East Bay Street (1809)
- 601 East Bay Street (1860)

Penfield Mariners' Church (also known as Bethel Mariners' Church, Seamen's Church and "the Bethel on the Bay" stood on the southern side Bay Street between around 1829 and around 1890. Named for Josiah Penfield, it is believed to have stood in the Reynolds Ward section of Bay Street. In January 1842, the church, "a splendid building", was described as being "cold and silent, with its closed-up doors unhallowed and untenanted". The following year, the Savannah Port Society began using the building. It was described as being "old and unsightly" in 1888 by the authors of Sanborn Fire Insurance Maps of Savannah.
