= George Anderson Stores =

Historic building in Georgia

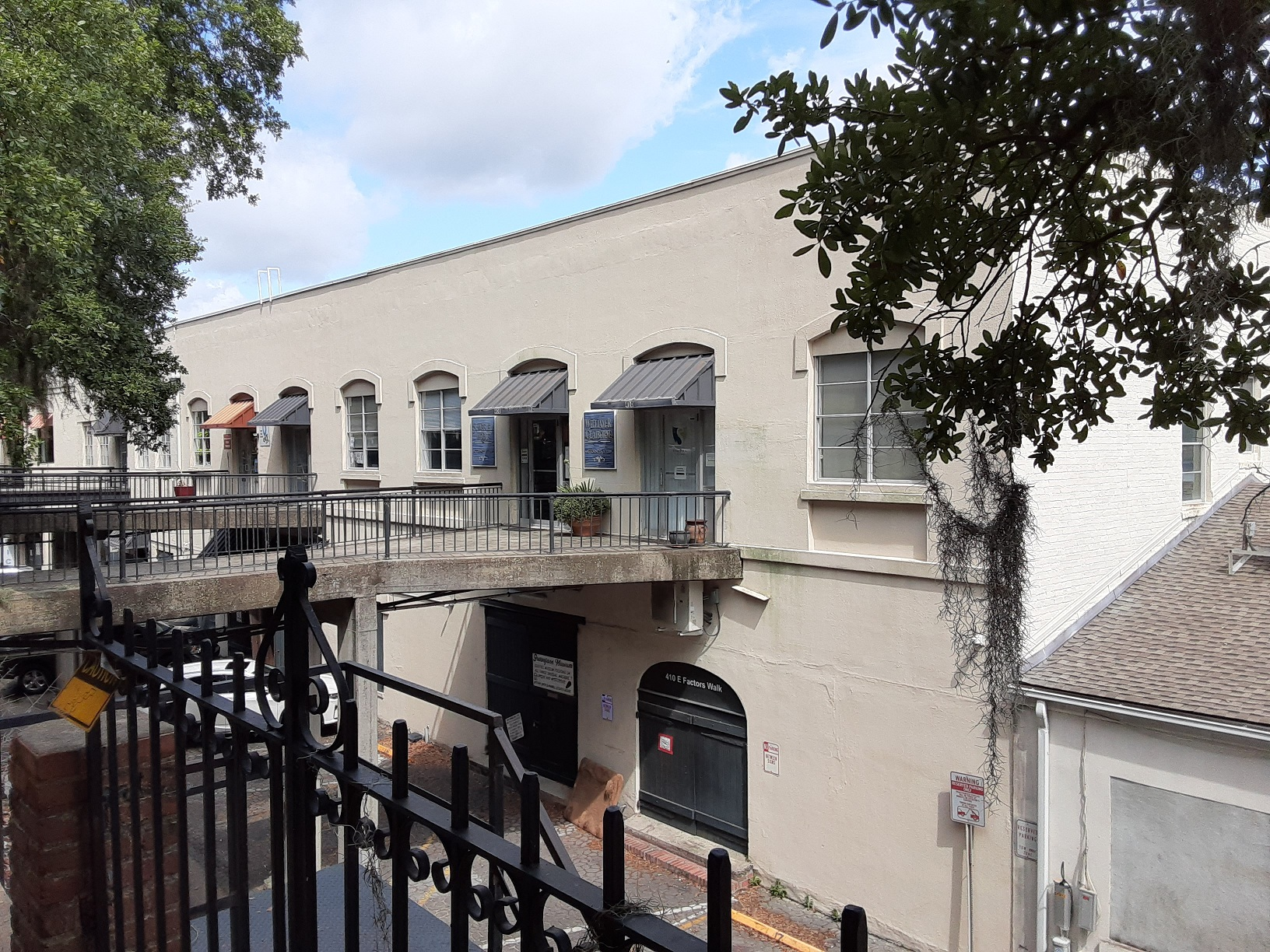
- The building in 2021, viewed from East Bay Street
- Interactive map of the George Anderson Stores area

General information
- Location: 402–410 East Bay Street, Savannah, Georgia, United States
- Coordinates: 32.0804°N 81.0865°W
- Completed: 1835 (191 years ago)

Technical details
- Floor count: 2–3

George Anderson Stores is a historic building in Savannah, Georgia, United States. Located in Savannah's Historic District, the addresses of some of the properties are East Bay Street, above Factors Walk, while others solely utilize the former King Cotton warehouses on River Street. As of February 2022, these are The Peanut Shop of Savannah and Spanky's. The current building was constructed in 1835, but George Anderson, a cotton merchant, banker and planter, had a store in the previous incarnation, known as Richard Wayne's Wharf, too. The Andersons were one of Savannah's most prominent families, notably in the Civil War years.

In October 1817, leading cabinetmaker Duncan Phyfe's first shipment to Savannah was recorded: he shipped six boxes to George Anderson and Son, which was active from 1817 to 1839.

In April 1837, merchants Clark and Pelott were advertising from "Anderson's new Stores".

The building stands adjacent to the Scott and Balfour Stores at 302–316 East Bay Street.

== See also ==
- Buildings in Savannah Historic District
