= 504–516 East Factors Walk =

Historic building in Georgia

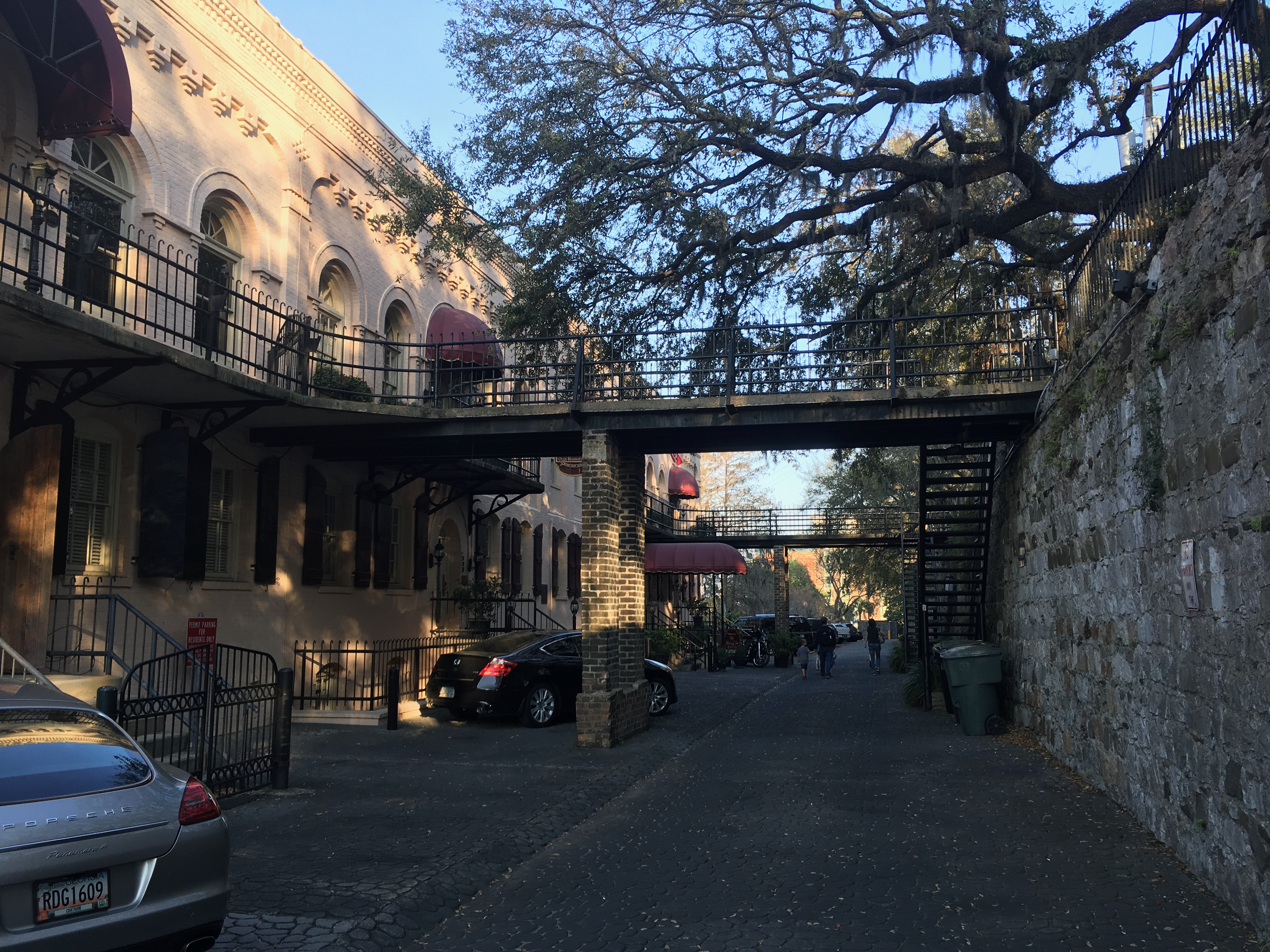
- 508 East Factors Walk, looking east, in 2017
- Interactive map of the 504–516 East Factors Walk area
- Alternative names: Tidewater Oil Company Building

General information
- Location: 508 East Factors Walk, Savannah, Georgia, United States
- Coordinates: 32.08007°N 81.085223°W
- Construction started: 1889
- Completed: 1892
- Client: Olde Harbour Inn
- Owner: HLC Hotels, Inc.

Technical details
- Floor count: 3

Design and construction
- Engineer: Dennis J. Murphy

504–516 East Factors Walk (also known as the Tidewater Oil Company Building) is a historic range of buildings in Savannah, Georgia, United States. The buildings date to 1889, when a three-year construction process began, but the earlier warehouse that stood at the location dated to 1812. The new construction added several pedestrian bridges that connect the building to the "Green" (Emmet Park) between the adjacent Rossiter Place and East Bay Street, passing over East Factors Walk. It is now Olde Harbour Inn.

Tidewater Oil Company leased two floors of the new building, but in 1892 the building was destroyed by a fire. The premises were rebuilt, and Standard Oil occupied the space until 1907. The building remained empty for more than two decades. Tide Water Oil Company was later purchased by Standard Oil.

In 1930, Alexander Brothers Company, a blue jeans and overall factory, moved in. They remained there until 1980.

In 1985, the building was completely renovated. It was reopened in 1987 as the Olde Harbour Inn, its current occupant. Four years later, Savannah's HLC Hotels, Inc. purchased the inn as the first property in its "collection of upscale historic Savannah inns." It now owns five other inns and hotels.

As of February 2022, the businesses occupying the ground floor of the River Street elevation are Travel House, Exotic Cigars and Something Different.

== Gallery ==
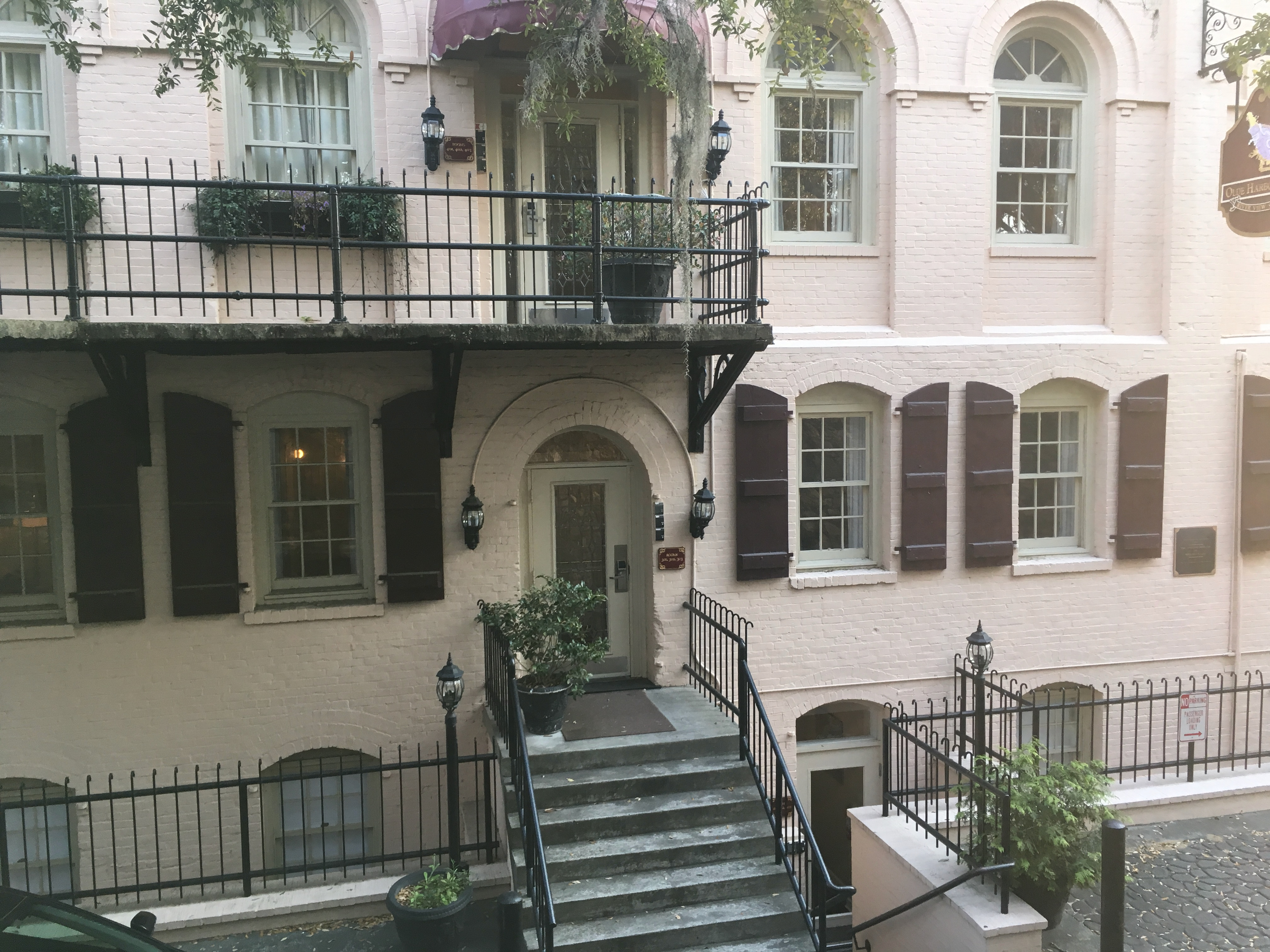
An entrance to Olde Harbour Inn in 2017

== See also ==
- Buildings in Savannah Historic District (Savannah, Georgia)
