= Scott and Balfour Stores =

Historic building in Georgia

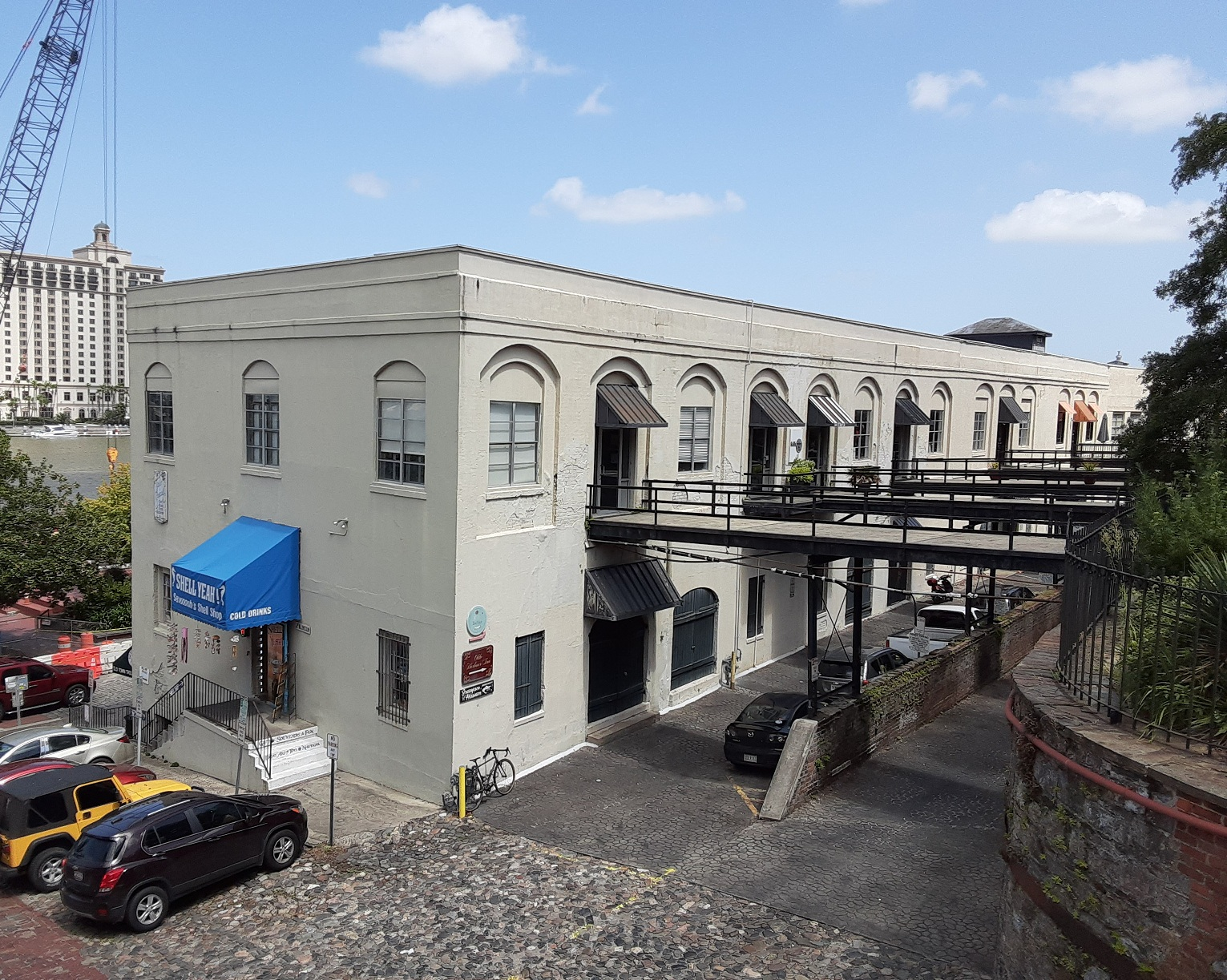
- The building in 2021, viewed from East Bay Street
- Interactive map of the Scott and Balfour Stores area
- Alternative names: Andrew Low Stores

General information
- Location: 302–316 East Bay Street, Savannah, Georgia, United States
- Coordinates: 32.0806°N 81.0872°W
- Completed: c. 1850 (176 years ago)

Technical details
- Floor count: 2–3

Scott and Balfour Stores (also known as the Andrew Low Stores) is a historic building in Savannah, Georgia, United States. Located in Savannah's Historic District, the addresses of some of the properties are East Bay Street, above Factors Walk, while others solely utilize the former King Cotton warehouses on River Street. As of February 2022, these are The Shrimp Factory, Bob's Your Uncle/Fannie's Your Aunt and Simply Savannah.

The property was built for Andrew Low, Robert Scott and John Balfour from 1823 to 1826. The top storey was added in the 1850s. Low was one of Savannah's most renowned cotton merchants, in business by the late 18th century.

In a survey for the Historic Savannah Foundation, Mary Lane Morrison found the building to be of significant status.

The building stands adjacent to the George Anderson Stores at 402–410 East Bay Street.

== River Street façade ==
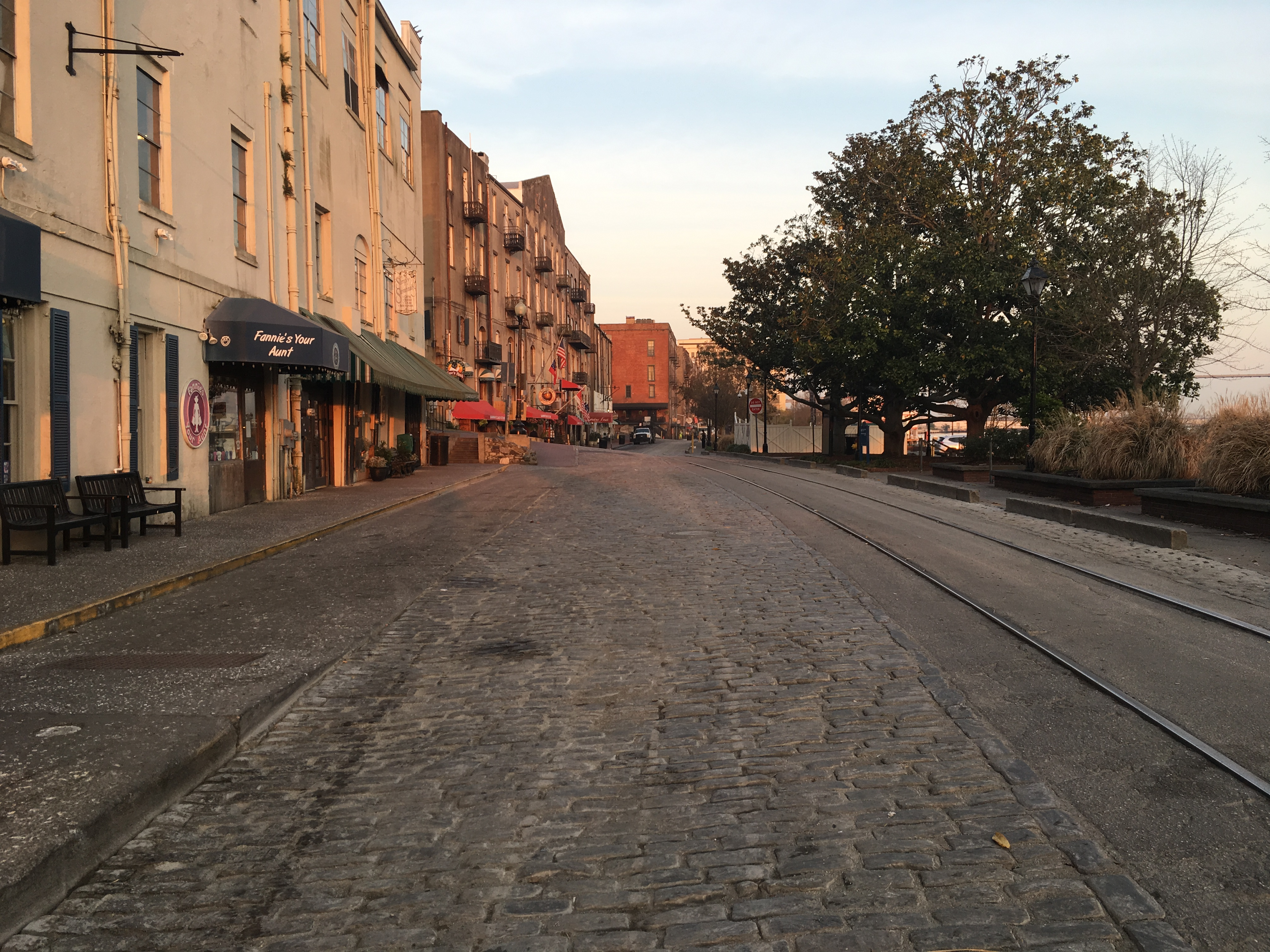
Looking west at sunrise, 2007

== See also ==
- Buildings in Savannah Historic District
