= Lowden Building =

Historic building in Georgia

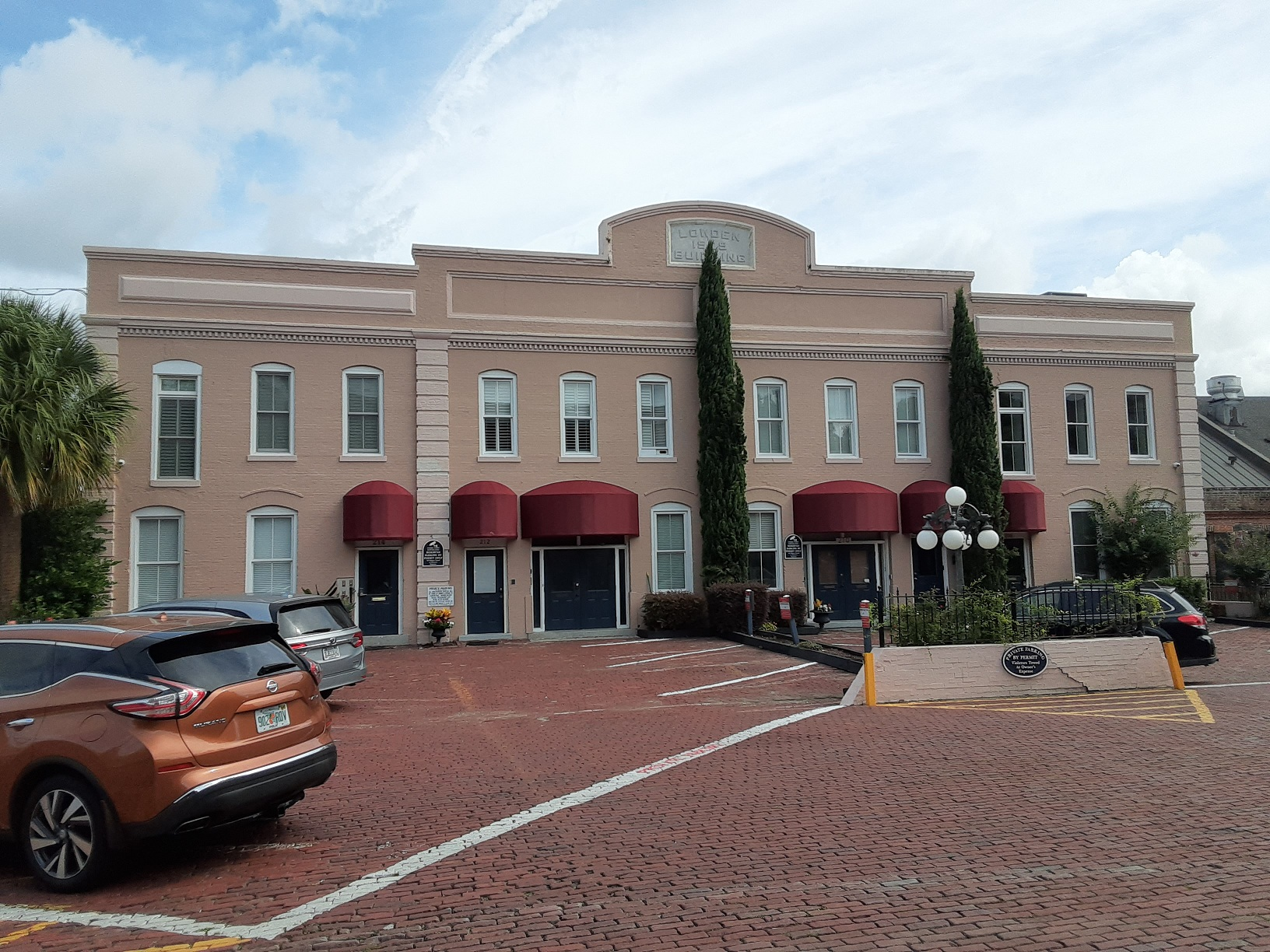
- The building in 2021, viewed West Bay Street
- Interactive map of the Lowden Building area

General information
- Location: 214 West Bay Street, Savannah, Georgia, United States
- Coordinates: 32.0823°N 81.0937°W
- Completed: 1910 (116 years ago)

Technical details
- Floor count: 3–5

Lowden Building is a historic building in Savannah, Georgia, United States. Located in Savannah's Historic District, the addresses of some of the properties are West Bay Street, above Factors Walk, while others solely utilize the former King Cotton warehouses on River Street. As of February 2022, these are Land & Sea Wear, The Black Dog, Perkins & Sons Chandlery and Earthbound Trading Company.

== George W. Lowden ==
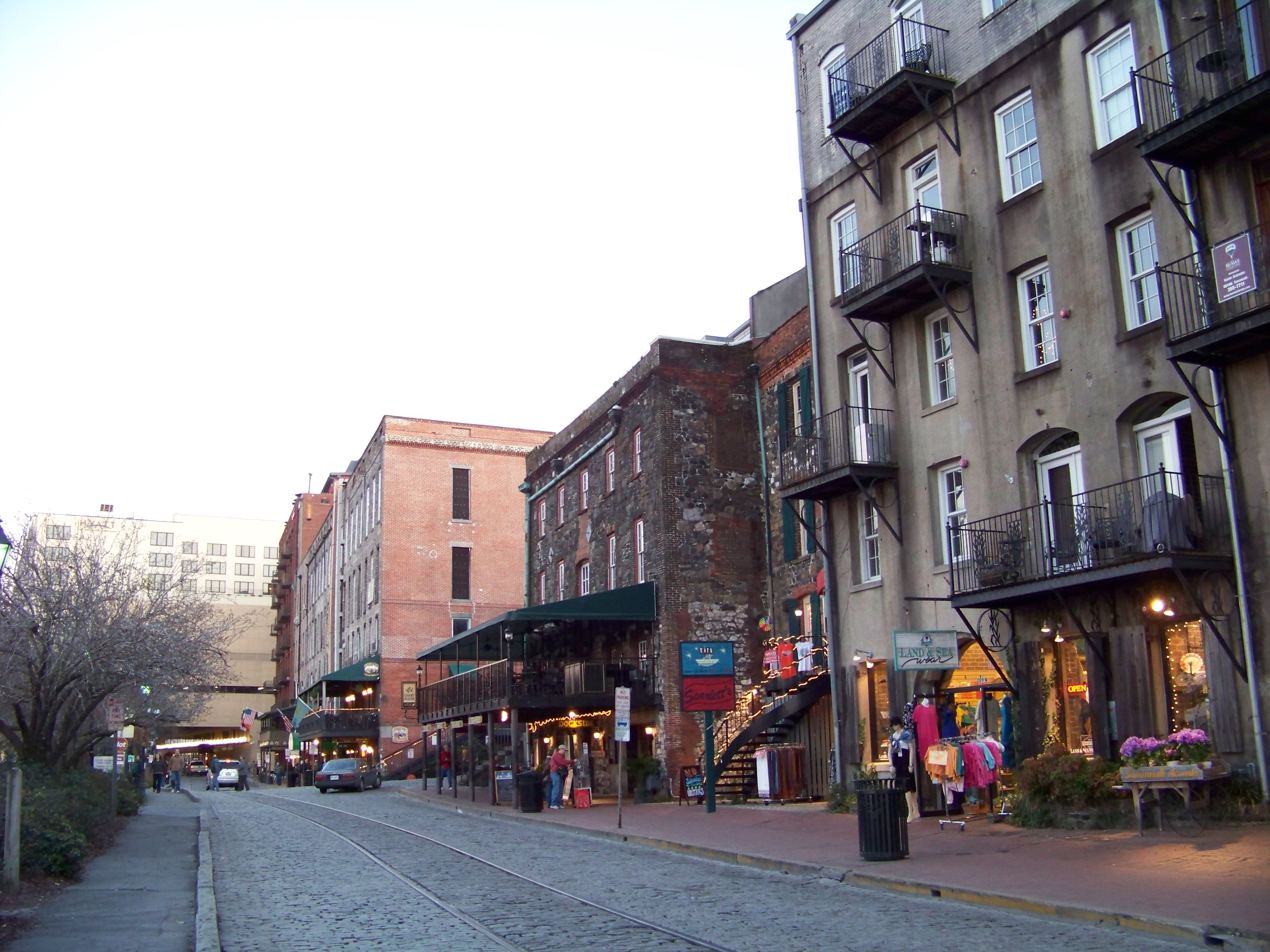
The River Street façade, with the William Taylor Stores in the center

The property was built in 1910 for George W. Lowden, an oyster merchant. In his first year of business, his Bluffton and Savannah Line sailed from his wharf, in front of his property on River Street, to Bluffton, South Carolina, on Mondays, Wednesdays and Saturdays. It made the return journey on Sundays, Tuesdays and Thursdays.

In 1912, the United States Attorney for the Eastern District of Tennessee filed a lawsuit against Lowden in the District Court of the United States for libel in the seizure of 150 cases of oysters, dispatched to Chastain, Davis & Vestal Co. in Knoxville, Tennessee, each containing two dozen cans that had allegedly been misbranded, a violation of the Food and Drugs Act. The shipment, made on or around September 15, 1911, was labeled on the cases as being "2 Doz. No. 1 Cove Oysters Venus Point Brand" and on the cans as being "Venus Point Brand Cove Oysters, Packed by Geo. W. Lowden, Main Office, Savannah, Georgia, Factories Georgia and South Carolina." Adulteration of the product was alleged, the reason being that the water had been "mixed and packed therewith and substituted for oysters, thus reducing their quality and strength." The pertinent point raised was that the product's labels did not state the presence of added water, nor bore any "statements that the product was other than oysters and oyster liquor."

On April 23, 1917, Lowden claimed his wharf was damaged by lines of wire rope from the pipeline dredge Morgan that passed along the Savannah River. He received damages of $39.95 from the U.S. Department of the Treasury.

Lowden died on July 7, 1920, in Hot Springs, Arkansas, where he been for treatment on a health issue. He is buried in Savannah's Bonaventure Cemetery. In 1929, his relative Harry Oliver Lowden filed a trademark registration for the canned oysters, canned shrimp and canned prawns business.

== Architectural detail ==
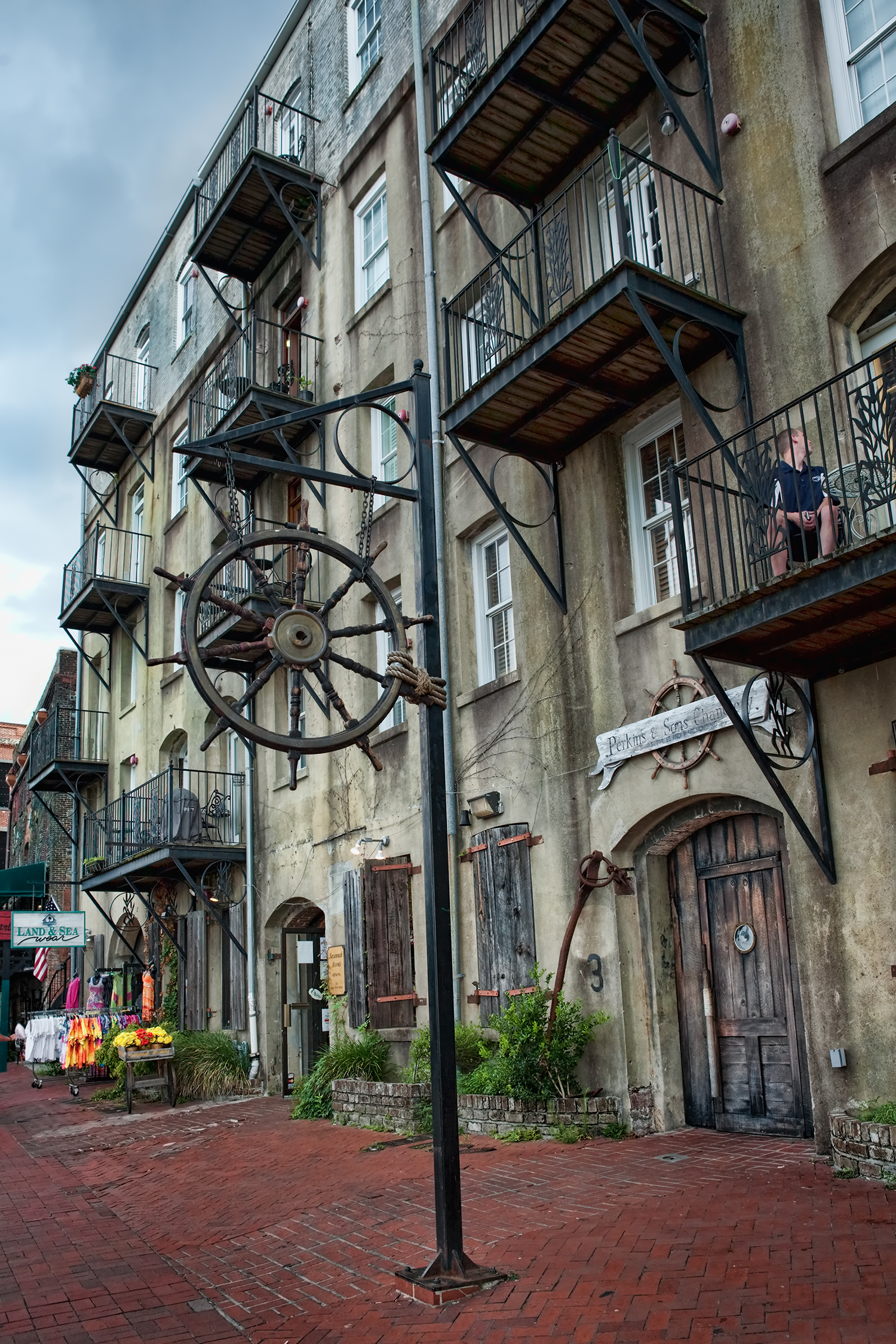
Iron balconies

== See also ==
- Buildings in Savannah Historic District
