= 220–230 West Bay Street =

Historic building in Georgia

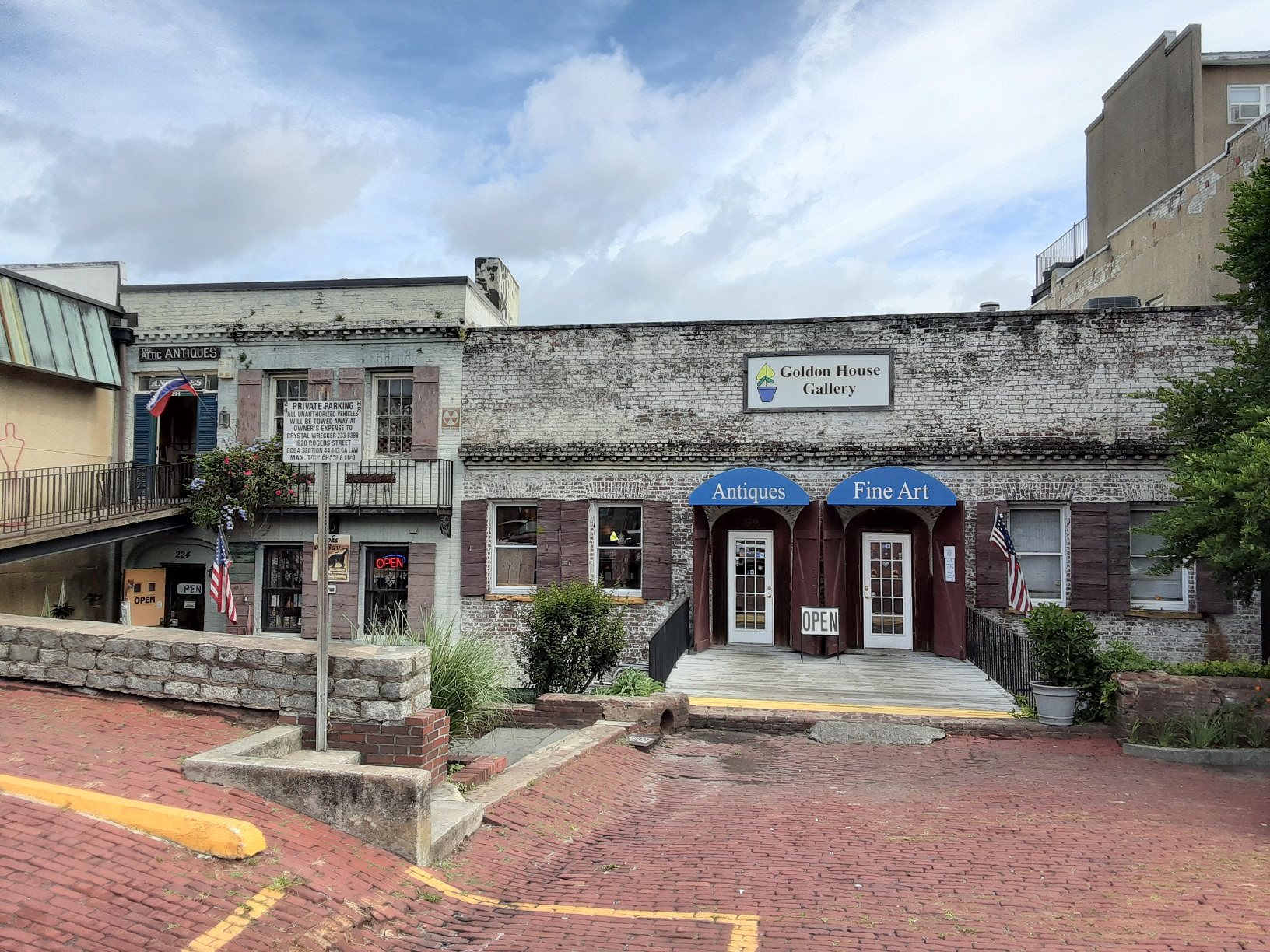
- The building in 2021, viewed from West Bay Street
- Interactive map of the 220–230 West Bay Street area
- Alternative names: Johnston Range

General information
- Location: 220–230 West Bay Street, Savannah, Georgia, United States
- Coordinates: 32.0825°N 81.0940°W
- Completed: 1823 (203 years ago)

Technical details
- Floor count: 3–4

220–230 West Bay Street (also known as the Johnston Range) is a row of three historic buildings in Savannah, Georgia, United States. Located in Savannah's Historic District, the addresses of some of the properties are West Bay Street, above Factors Walk, while others solely utilize the former King Cotton warehouses on River Street. As of February 2022, these are Nourish, Harley-Davidson Motory Cycles, Charleston Hemp Collective and Dub's Public House.

The building was completed by 1823, for "Matthew Johnston and others," making it one of the earliest buildings in the riverfront area. The western end of the building, number 224, was damaged by fire in 1851.

In 1917, the Hecker-Jones-Jewell Milling Company of New York City had an office at number 220.

The International Milling Company was occupying numbers 220 and 222 around 1940.

== River Street façade ==
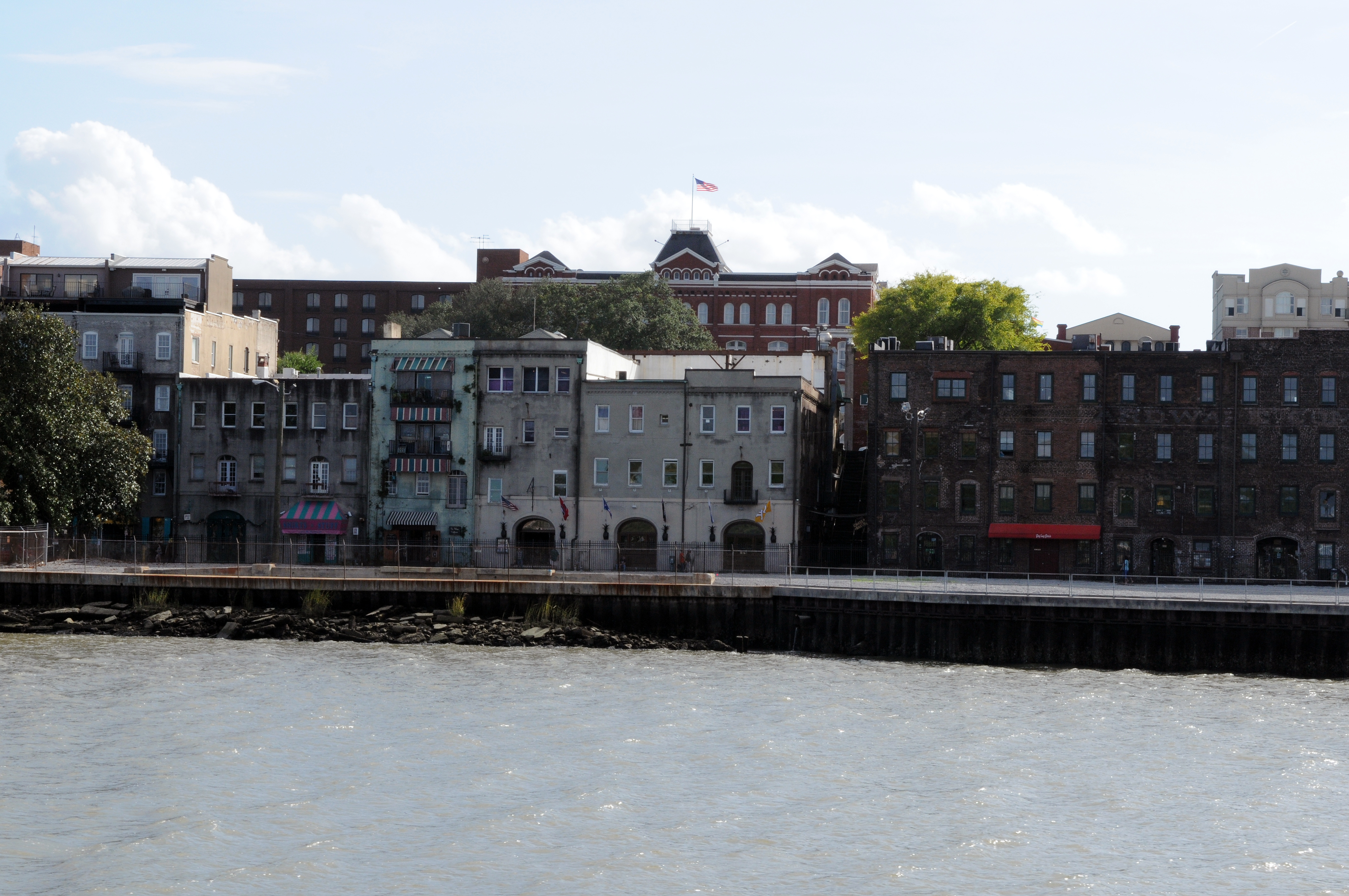
This 2012 view is now obscured by the construction of the JW Marriott Savannah Plant Riverside District on the northern side of River Street. The John Williamson Range is on the right

== See also ==
- Buildings in Savannah Historic District
