= Jones/De Renne Range =

Historic building in Georgia

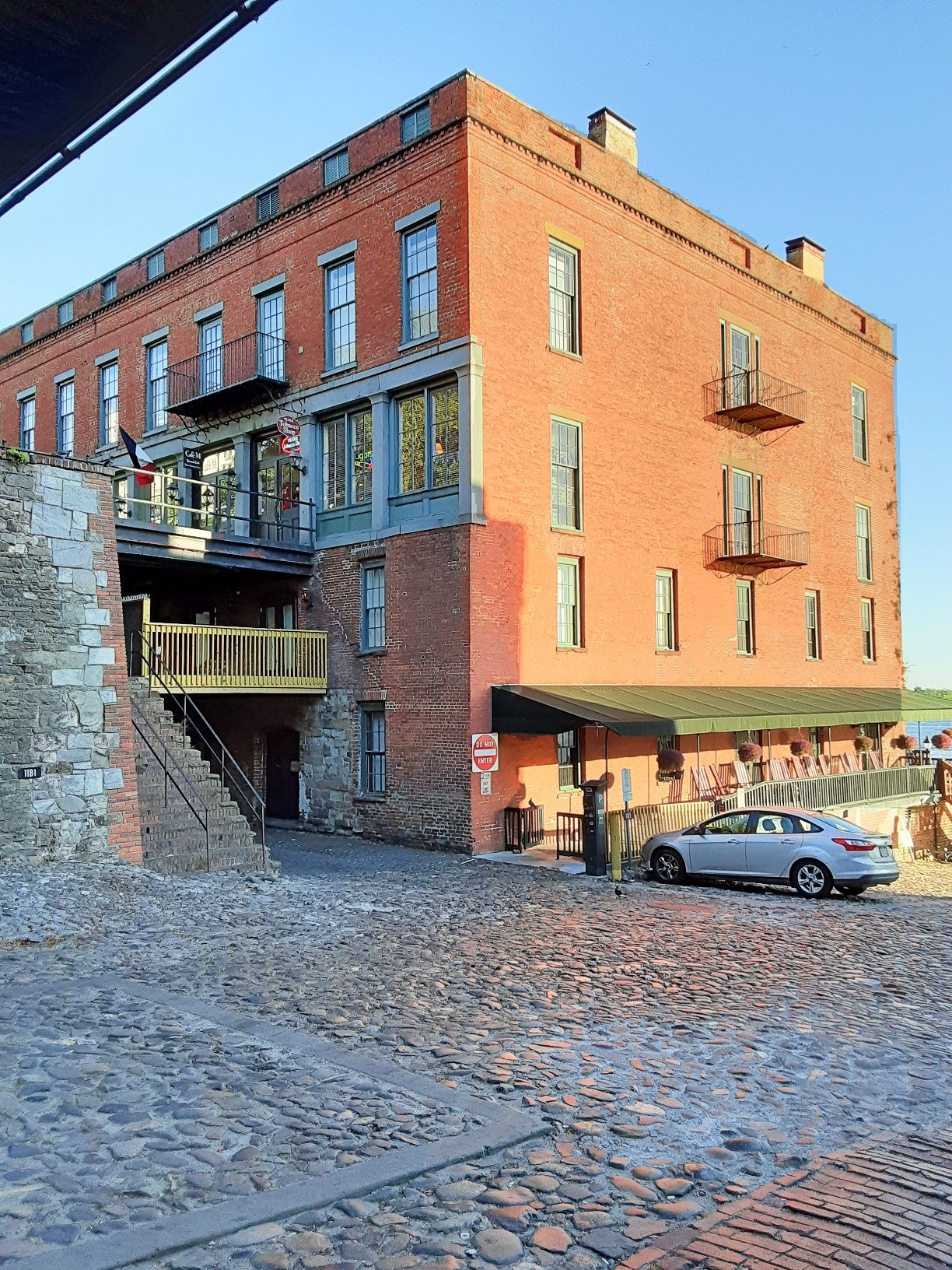
- The building in 2022
- Interactive map of the Jones/De Renne Range area

General information
- Location: 112–130 East Bay Street, Savannah, Georgia, United States
- Coordinates: 32.0810°N 81.0893°W

Technical details
- Floor count: 5
- Jones/Derenne Range
- U.S. Historic district – Contributing property
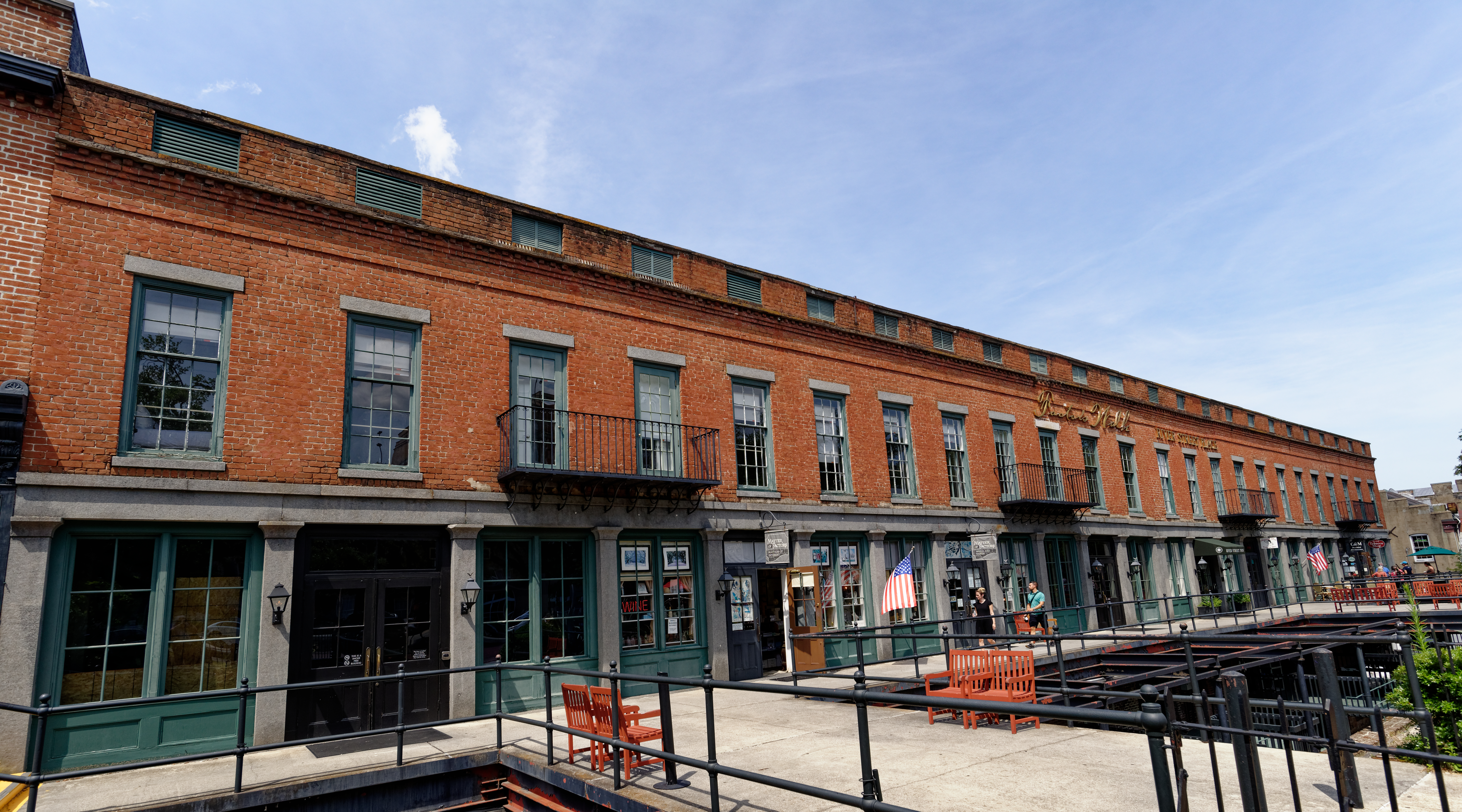
- 2020 view of building
- Part of: Savannah Historic District (ID66000277)

Significant dates
- Designated: November 13, 1966
- Designated CP: November 13, 1966

Jones/De Renne Range, also known as Jones' Lower Range, is a historic building located on East Bay Street in Savannah, Georgia, United States. Located in Savannah's Historic District, parts of the building date to 1817. The Savannah Historic District is listed on the National Register of Historic Places, and this building is a contributing property.

== History ==
The building was originally a cotton warehouse, split between the Jones Stores (east) and Hunter Stores (west).

=== River Street Inn ===
The top four floors of 124 East Bay Street have been occupied since 1986 by River Street Inn, named for the street it backs onto and which serves the lower three floors. The inn is a member of the Historic Hotels of America program of the National Trust for Historic Preservation. The first floor (accessible from River Street) is given over to a restaurant.

==== Historic Hotels of America ====
"Taking up an entire city block and wrapped around a gorgeous central atrium, the five-story structure first operated as a storing, grading, and exporting facility for cotton. The floors of the lower two levels were built in 1817 out of recycled ballast stone with wide, arched doorways to accommodate moving large bales of cotton, while the top three floors, added in 1853, have floor-to-ceiling windows to allow maximum light into what was once used as offices, for the factors."

== River Street façade ==
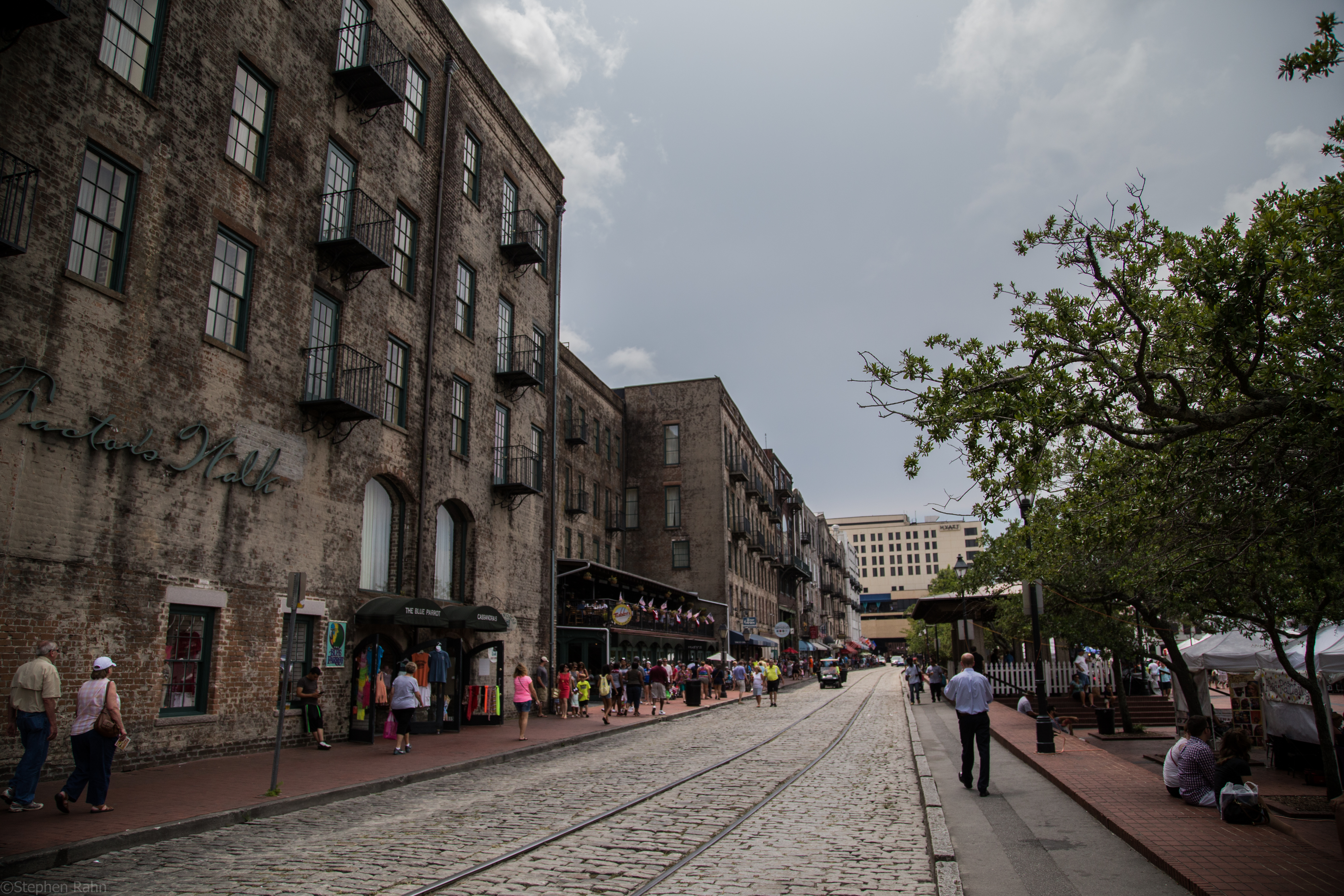
Looking west, 2014

== See also ==
- Buildings in Savannah Historic District
