= John Stoddard (businessman) =

American businessman (1809–1879)

- Born: March 11, 1809; Northampton, Massachusetts, U.S.
- Died: July 5, 1879 (aged 70); Savannah, Georgia, U.S.
- Occupation: businessman
- Known for: President of the Georgia Historical Society

John Stoddard (March 11, 1809 – July 5, 1879) was an American businessman based in Savannah, Georgia, where he was a cotton merchant and planter. He was also president of the Georgia Historical Society from 1867 to 1868, having been its first vice-president between 1864 and 1867.

== Career ==
In 1851, Stoddard was elected a director of the Augusta and Waynesboro Railroad.

He was elected president of Evergreen Cemetery Company in 1872. It is now part of Bonaventure Cemetery.

At the time of his death, Stoddard had been an elder of Savannah's Independent Presbyterian Church for 35 years.

== Personal life ==
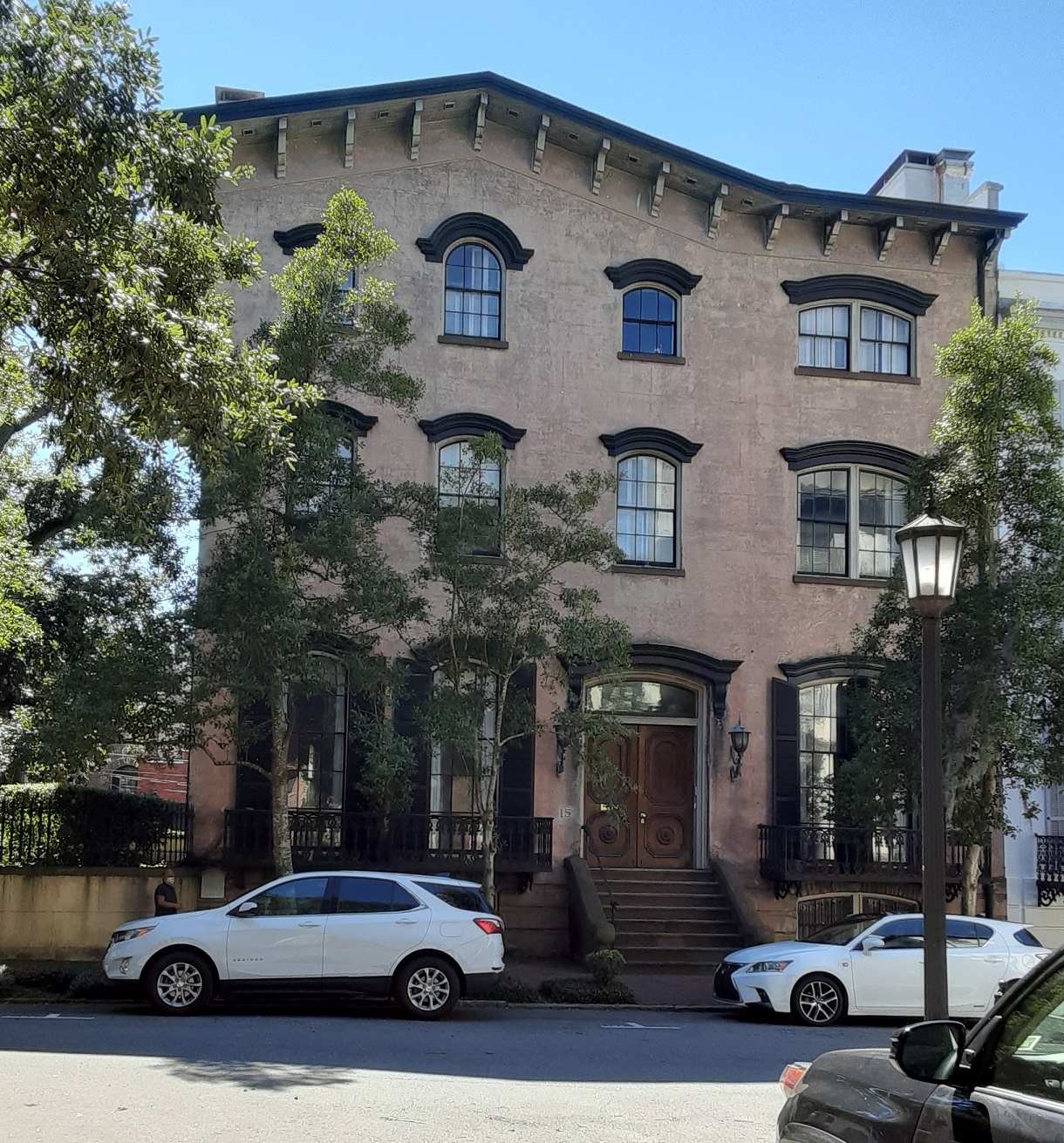
What is now known as the John Stoddard House, at 15 West Perry Street in Savannah, Georgia

Stoddard was born in Northampton, Massachusetts, to Solomon Stoddard (1771–1860) and Sarah Tappan (1771–1852), but later moved to Savannah, Georgia. He constructed several buildings on the city's River Street.

In 1836, he married South Carolina native Mary Lavinia Mongin, with whom he had four children (Mary, Isabelle, John and Harry). They met in Paris, France, while Stoddard was on business for his company Edwards & Stoddard, of Boston. They lived, from around 1847, in what is today known as the Philbrick–Eastman House in Savannah's Chippewa Square.

Stoddard became a widower in 1865 after the death of Mary, aged 45 or 46.

In 1867, Stoddard had built the home at 15 West Perry Street in Chippewa Square.

In the summer of 1871, Stoddard was a pallbearer at the funeral of William B. Hodgson, for whom W. B. Hodgson Hall, today's home of the Georgia Historical Society Research Center, is named.

== Death ==
Stoddard died on July 5, 1879, in Savannah. He was 70 years old.

== See also ==
- Lower Stoddard Range
- Upper Stoddard Range
