= Lower Stoddard Range =

Historic buildings in Savannah, Georgia

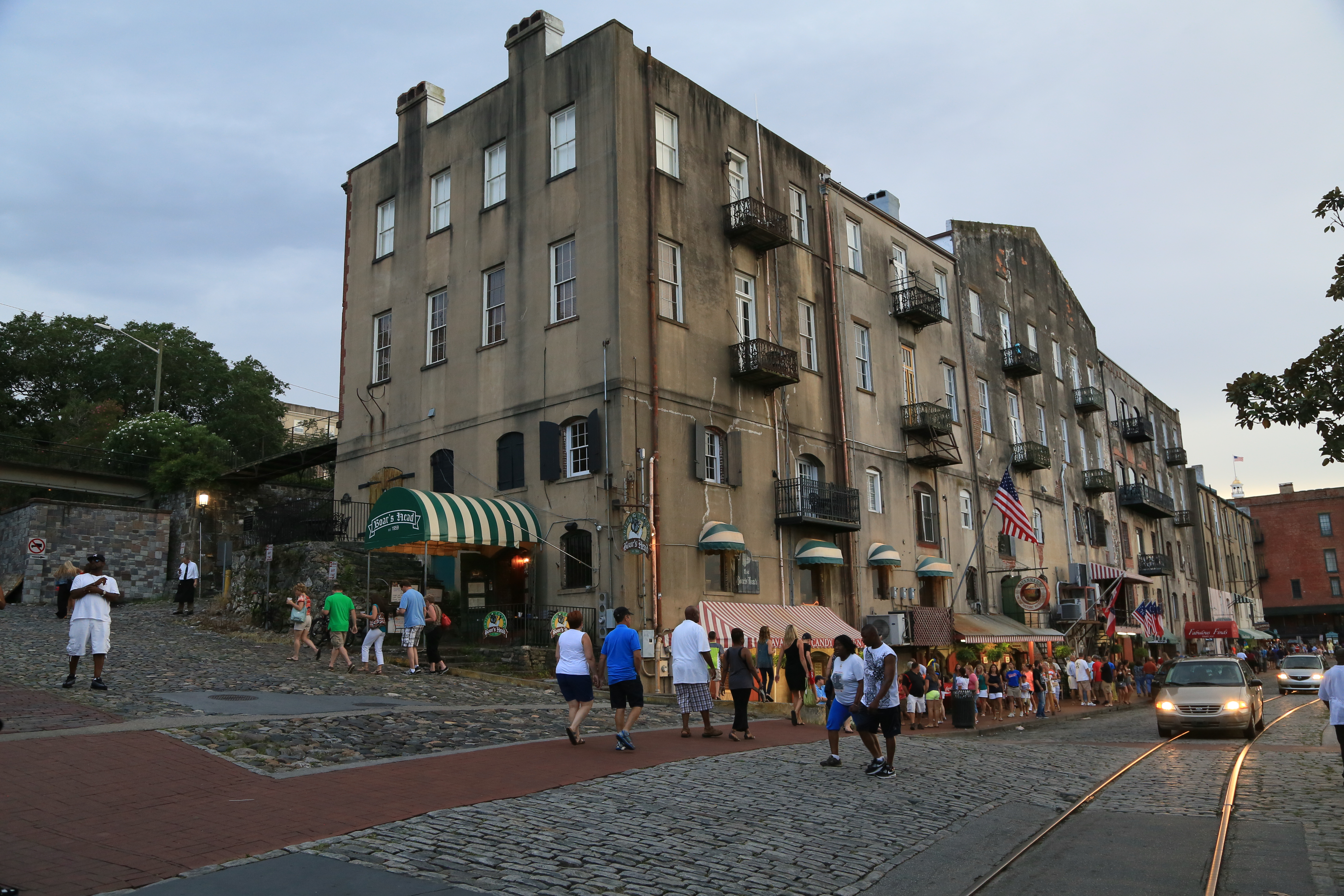
- The rear of the eastern end of the range, on River Street at the Lincoln Street ramp, in 2013
- Interactive map of the Lower Stoddard Range area

General information
- Location: 208–230 East Bay Street, Savannah, Georgia, United States
- Coordinates: 32.08073°N 81.0880°W
- Completed: 1858 (168 years ago)

Technical details
- Floor count: 4–5

Lower Stoddard Range is a historic range of buildings in Savannah, Georgia, United States. Located in Savannah's Historic District, the addresses of some of the properties are East Bay Street, above Factors Walk, while others solely utilize the former King Cotton warehouses on River Street. As of February 2022, the businesses occupying the ground floor of the River Street elevation are: Boar's Head Grill & Tavern, Savannah's Candy Kitchen, Gallery 209 and Christmas on the River.

The building stands adjacent to Archibald Smith Stores, the two separated only by steps leading to and from River Street and Factors Walk.

The building was constructed by 1858 by John Stoddard (1809–1879), on foundations that were previously the three lower tiers of the early-19th-century Simon Fraser Stores (western portion of the range) and Samuel Howard Stores (eastern portion). Fraser's property was known colloquially as Coffee House Wharf.

Factors Edgar L. Guerard and Edward L. Holcombe (1840–1875), formerly a major for the Confederates in the Civil War, were operating their general commission and shipping merchants enterprise from "5 Stoddard's Lower Range, Bay Street" in 1869. At number 7, meanwhile, Grantham Israel Taggart (1828–1905) was providing a similar service, under the name Taggart & Company, in addition to offering anthracite and bituminous coal.

In 1898, during the Spanish–American War, the signal corps had their command headquarters in the range.

The buildings that comprise Upper Stoddard Range are at 12–42 East Bay Street, to the west of the lower range.

== Detail ==
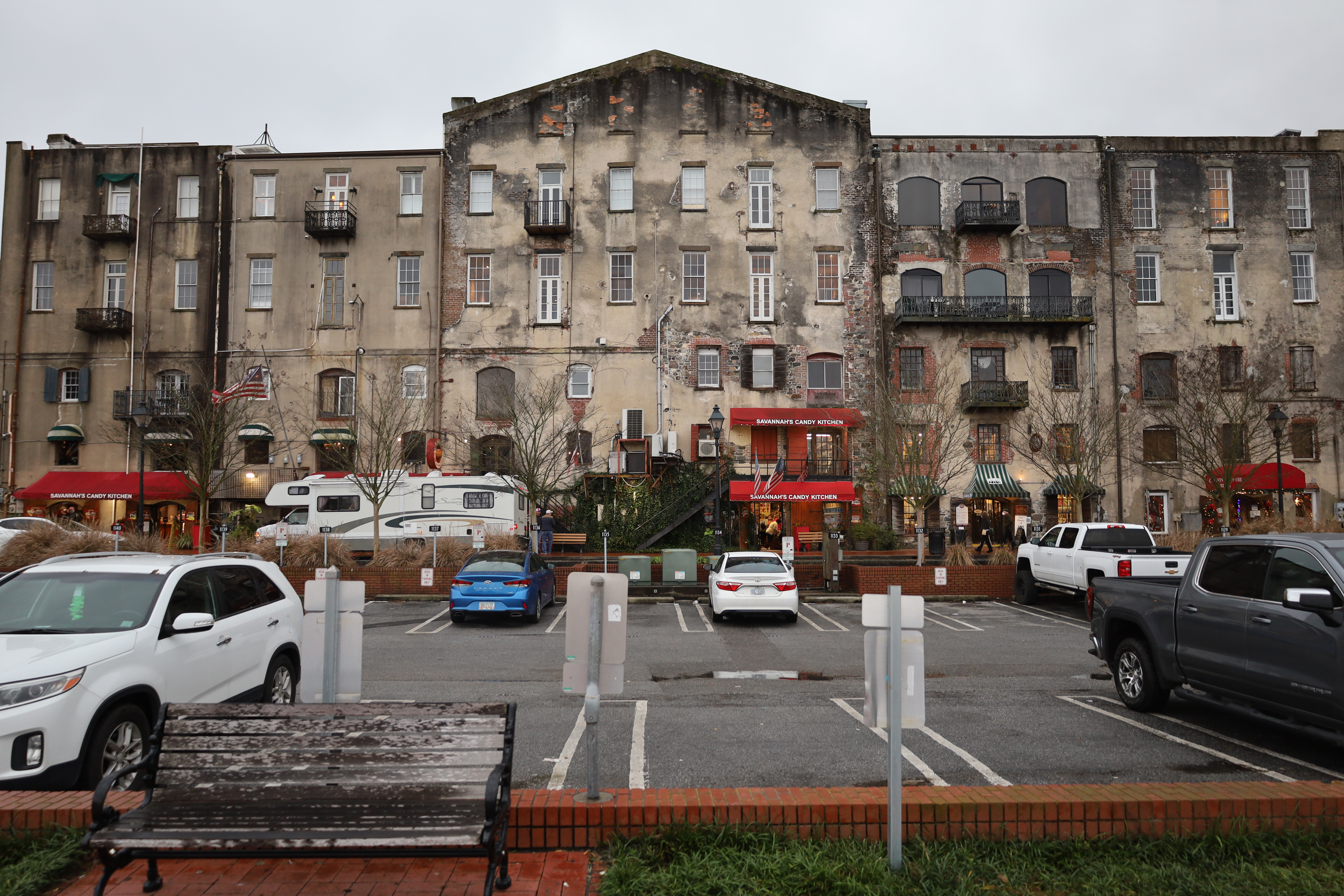
A section centered on 225 East Bay Street, viewed from River Street

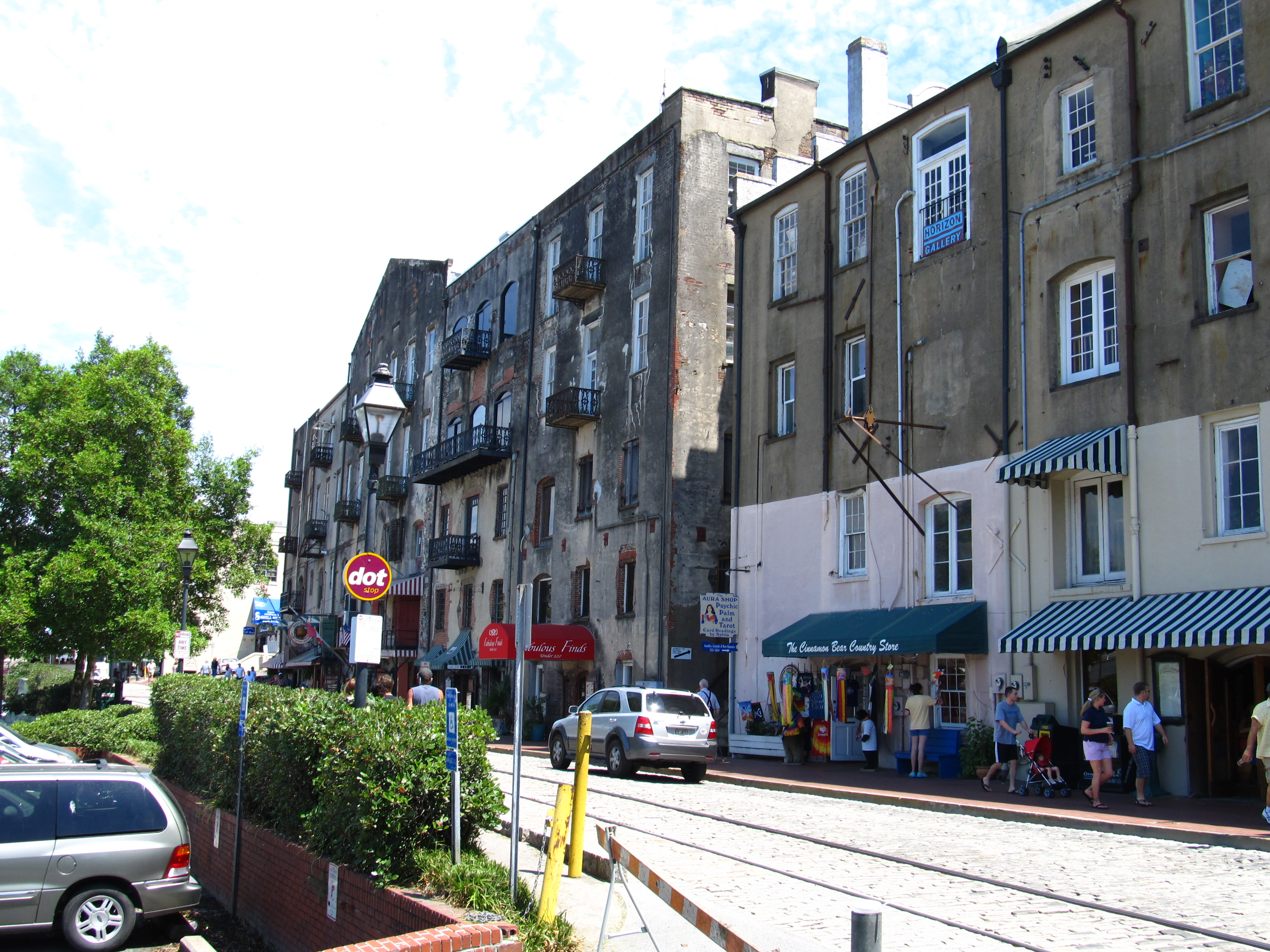
201–205 East River Street, built circa 1823, with the Archibald Smith Stores on the right

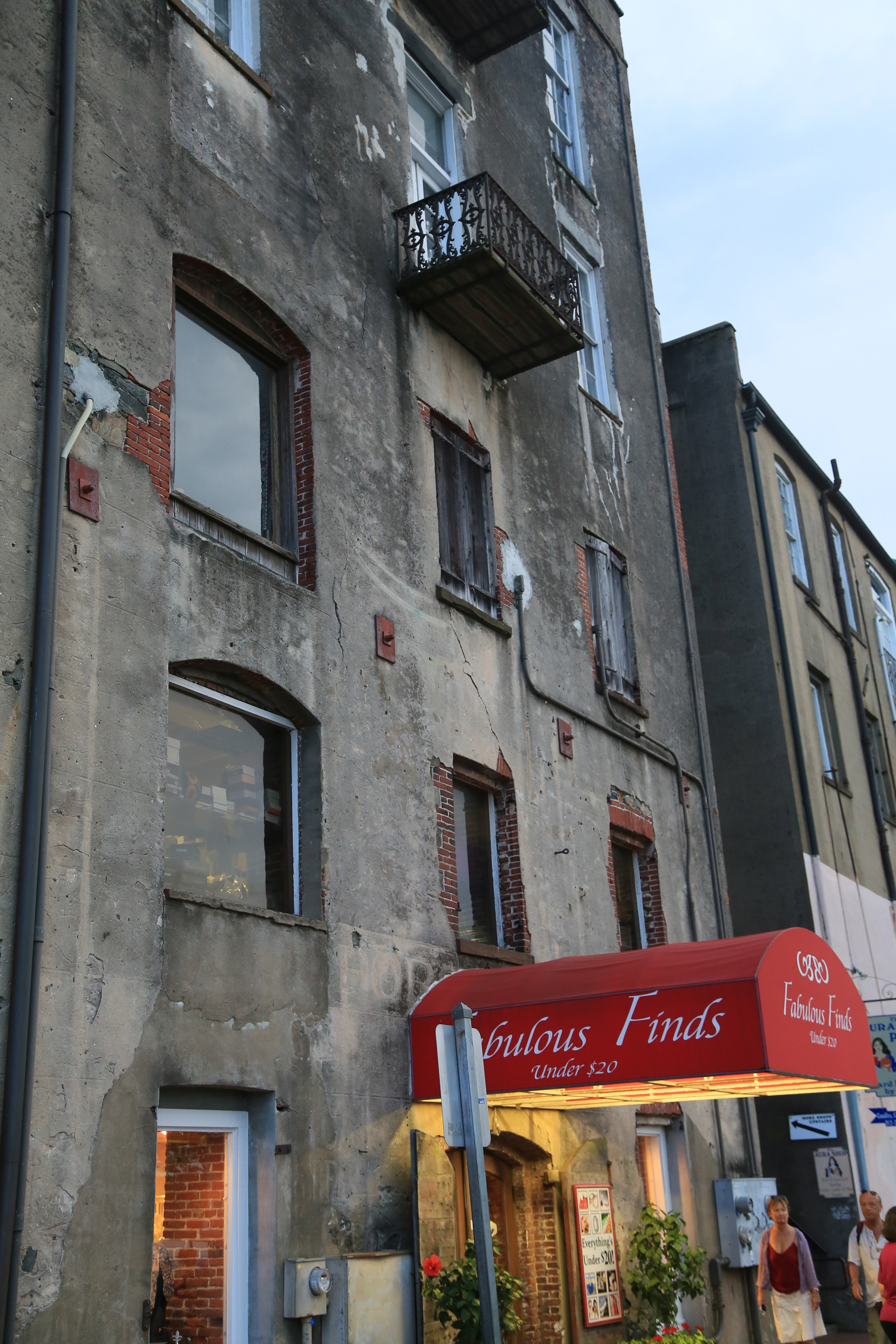
207–209 East River Street

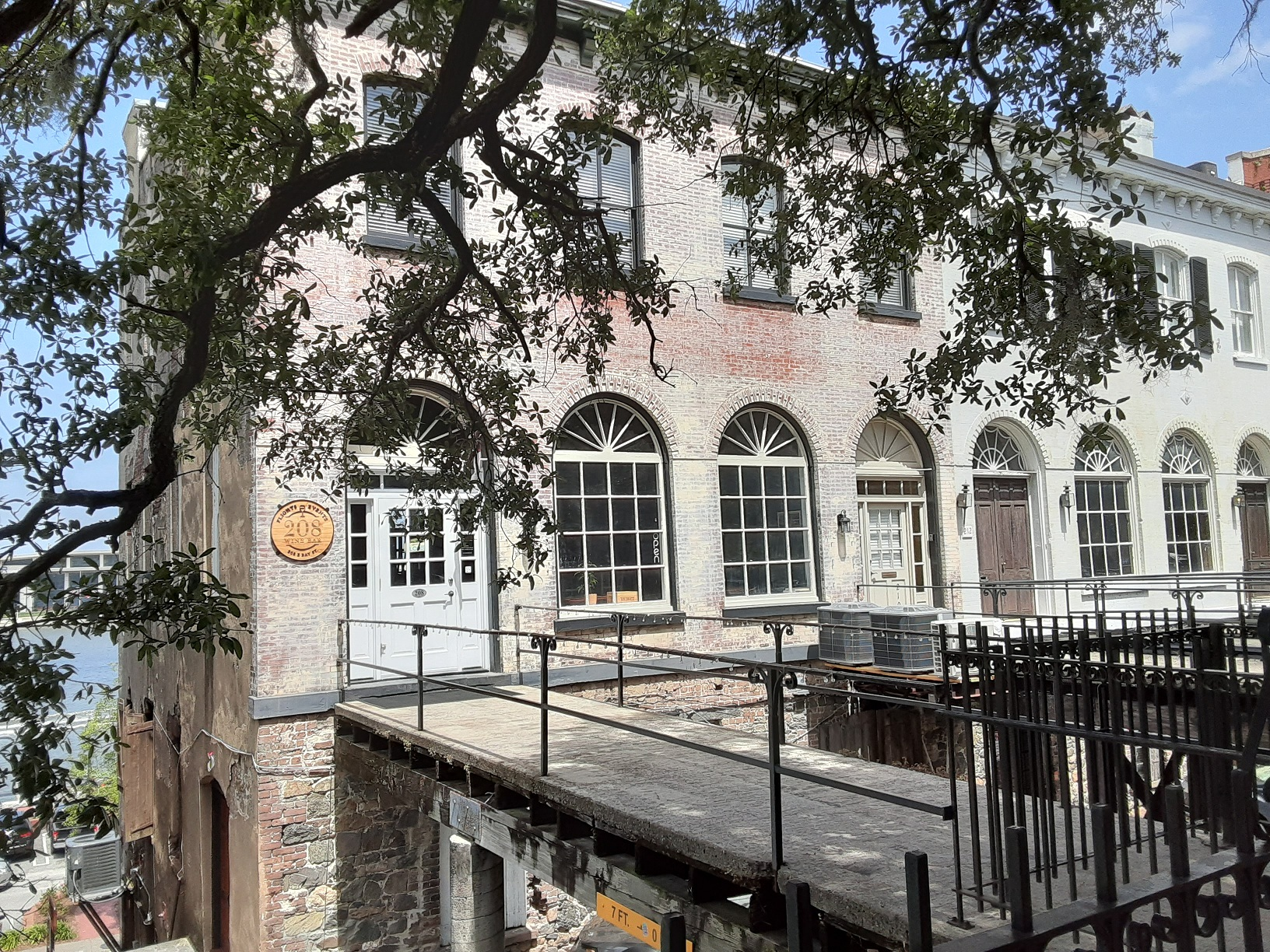
Above River Street and Factors Walk, 208 East Bay Street at the western end of the range

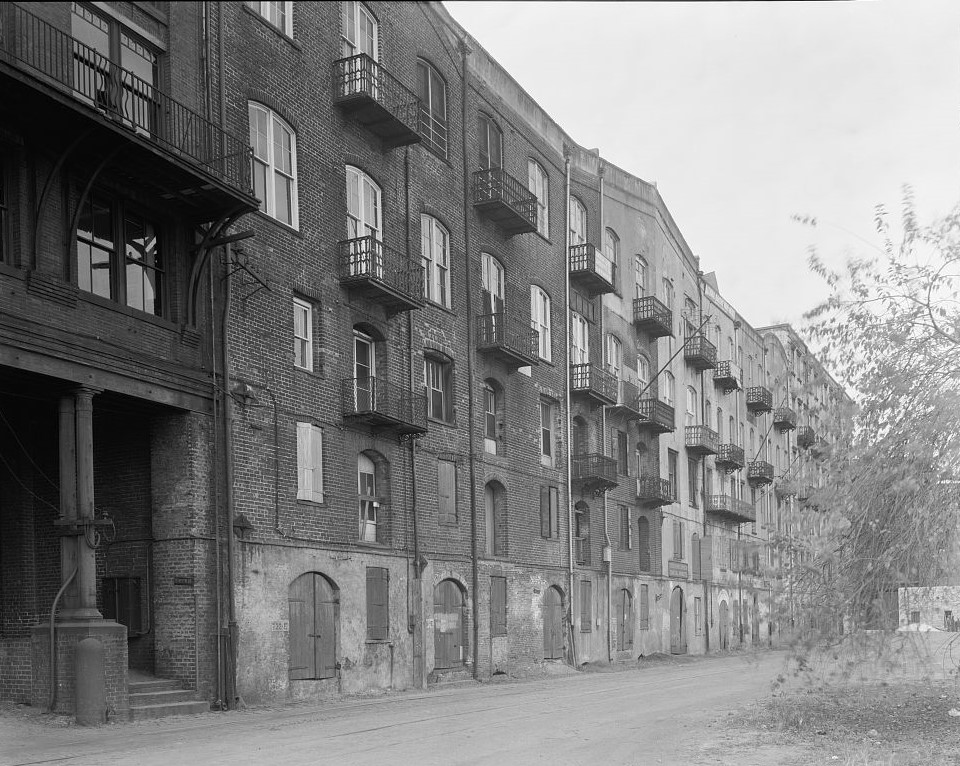
The rear of 220–230 East Bay Street around 1940

== See also ==
- Buildings in Savannah Historic District
- Upper Stoddard Range
