= Grantham Israel Taggart =

United States Army colonel (1828–1905)

- Born: October 17, 1828; Northumberland County, Pennsylvania, U.S.
- Died: October 24, 1905 (aged 77); Savannah, Georgia, U.S.
- Burial place: Riverview Cemetery, Northumberland, Pennsylvania, U.S.
- Spouse: Martha Ethel Kirksey (m. –1904; her death)
- Military career
- Allegiance: United States of America
- Rank: Colonel
- Conflicts: American Civil War

Grantham Israel Taggart (October 17, 1828 – October 24, 1905) was a colonel in the United States Army. He was also a noted merchant in Savannah, Georgia.

== Early life ==
Taggart was born in 1828 in Northumberland County, Pennsylvania, to James Taggart and Deborah Israel. At age sixteen, he worked in the family's grocery store while continuing his studies. He taught two terms at a school across the West Branch Susquehanna River from his hometown.

== Career ==
In 1846, he served in the Mexican–American War. He was promoted to second lieutenant of the 6th Company, 1st Battalion, 3rd Regiment of the Pennsylvania National Guard.

He moved to Philadelphia in 1853, working as a clerk in several stores along Market Street. He formed a partnership with two men in a hat, cap and fur business when the American Civil War began in 1861. He joined Philadelphia's first volunteer company. He was made second lieutenant and, later, captain under General John A. McClernand. He served with the rank of lieutenant-colonel while serving alongside General Ulysses S. Grant, with whom he developed a friendship, during the siege of Vicksburg.

While serving in the Union army, he received several commendations (from Brigadier General John H. Wilson and Major John A. McClernand, for example) and medals for his bravery on scouting expeditions.

== Personal life ==
In 1866, at the war's conclusion, Taggart relocated to Savannah, Georgia, where he established a coal business on at 7 Lower Stoddard Range on River Street named Taggart & Company. He also traded anthracite. It was later run by his sons.

In recalling the men who have contributed to the business prosperity of Savannah, Georgia, and whose names belong to the roll of men of distinction in military life, the late Col. Grantham I. Taggart claims prominent notice.

— William Harden, A History of Savannah and South Georgia, Volume 2

Taggart married Tallahassee native Martha Ethel Kirksey, with whom he had two known children, sons Grantham Israel Taggart Jr. in 1874 and John. He was Martha's second husband, after the death of Captain Leonard Eddy Johnson in 1870, while she was pregnant with their daughter, Annie.

== Death ==
Taggart died in 1905 in Savannah, aged 77. He was interred in Riverview Cemetery in Northumberland, Pennsylvania. His wife, who predeceased him by sixteen months, is buried beside her first husband in Savannah's Bonaventure Cemetery.
