= Jones and Telfair Range =

Historic building in Georgia

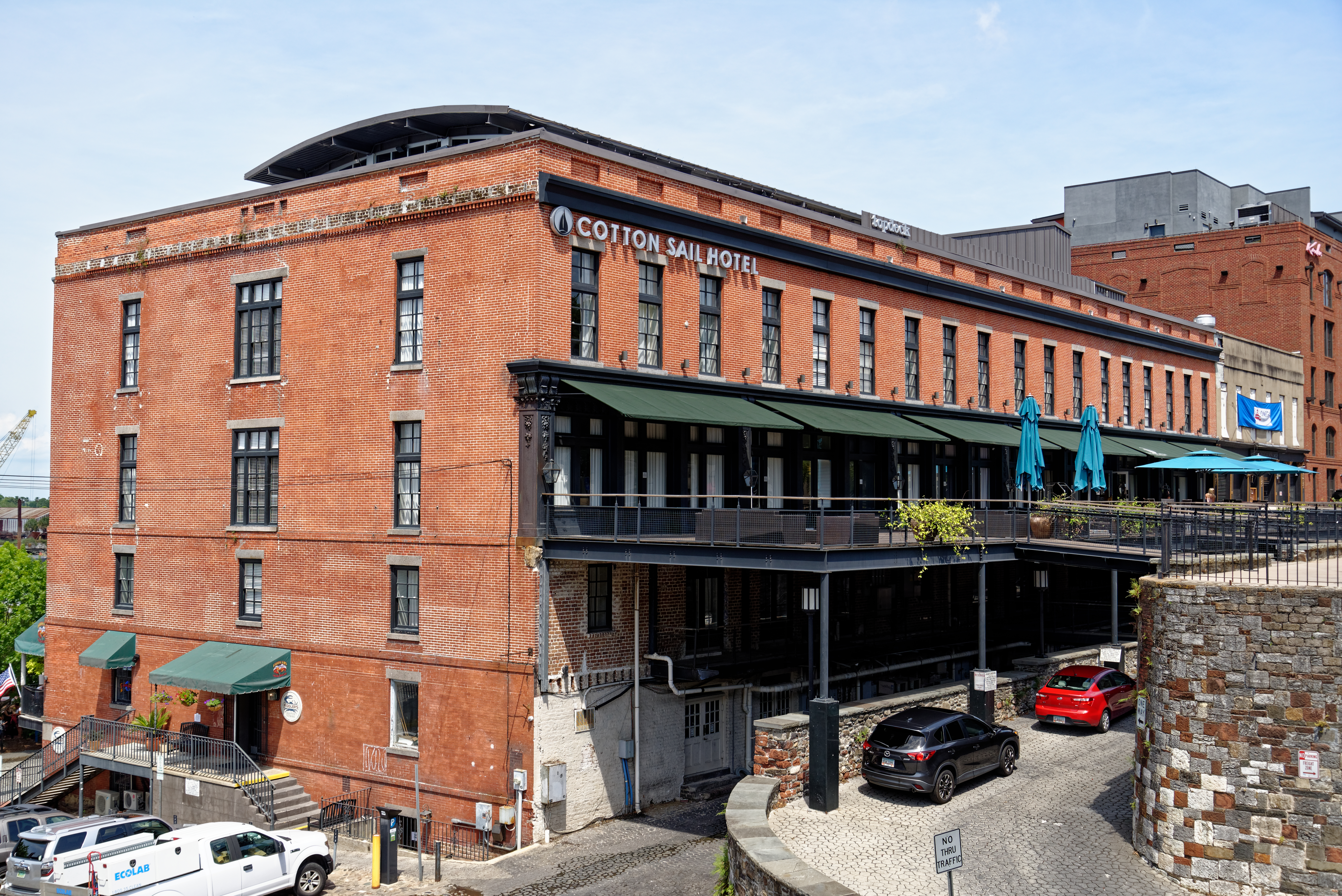
- 2020
- Interactive map of the Jones and Telfair Range area

General information
- Location: 112–130 West Bay Street, Savannah, Georgia, United States
- Coordinates: 32.0820°N 81.0927°W
- Completed: 1854 (172 years ago)

Technical details
- Floor count: 4–5

Design and construction
- Architect: Sholl & Fay

Jones and Telfair Range, also known as Jones' Upper Range, is a historic range of buildings in Savannah, Georgia, United States. Located in Savannah's Historic District, the Cotton Sail Hotel, a Hilton Hotels property, occupies the West Bay Street elevation, above Factors Walk, while others solely utilize the former King Cotton warehouses on River Street. As of February 2022, the businesses occupying the ground floor of the River Street elevation are Whispers, the Cotton Sail Hotel, River House Seafood and Fiddlers' Crab House. Kevin Barry's Pub closed in 2020 after nearly forty years in business.

The building was completed in 1854, attributed to Charles Sholl and Calvin Fay, for George Wymberly Jones and the Telfair estate.

== Cotton Sail Hotel ==
The Cotton Sail Hotel is a hotel with its main entrance on West River Street at Barnard Street, though the hotel lists its address as 126 West Bay Street and parking is off West Bay Street. Its rooftop bar is one of few in Savannah. The hotel opened in 2014, by brothers Anil Patel and Kirit Patel. The hotel received the Georgia Trust for Historic Preservation's Excellence in Rehabilitation award, the 2015 Historic Savannah Foundation's Preservation Award, and the Asian American Hotel Owners Association's IAHA Independent Hotel of the Year Award.

== River Street façade ==
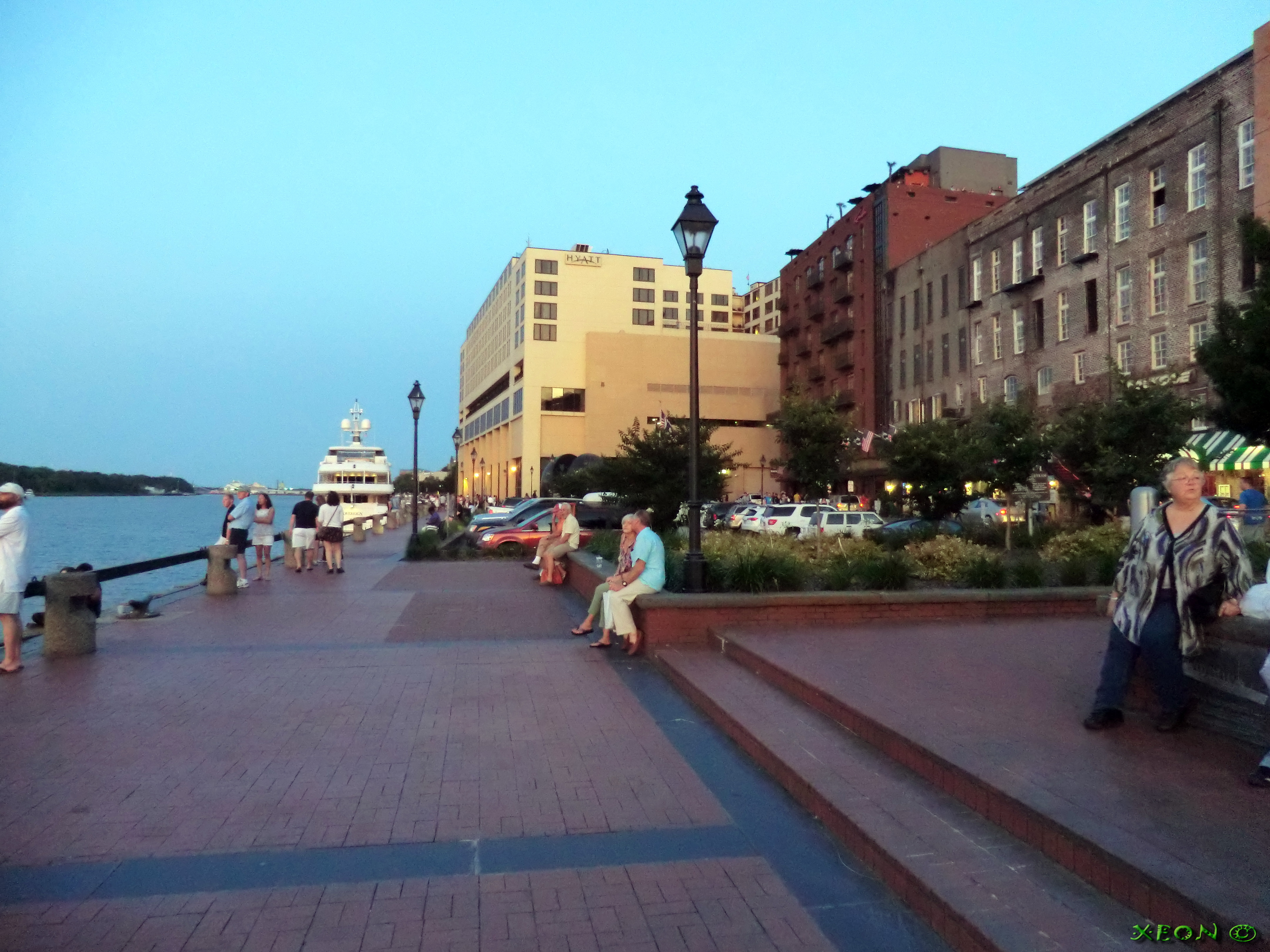
Looking east to the Hyatt Regency Savannah, 2013

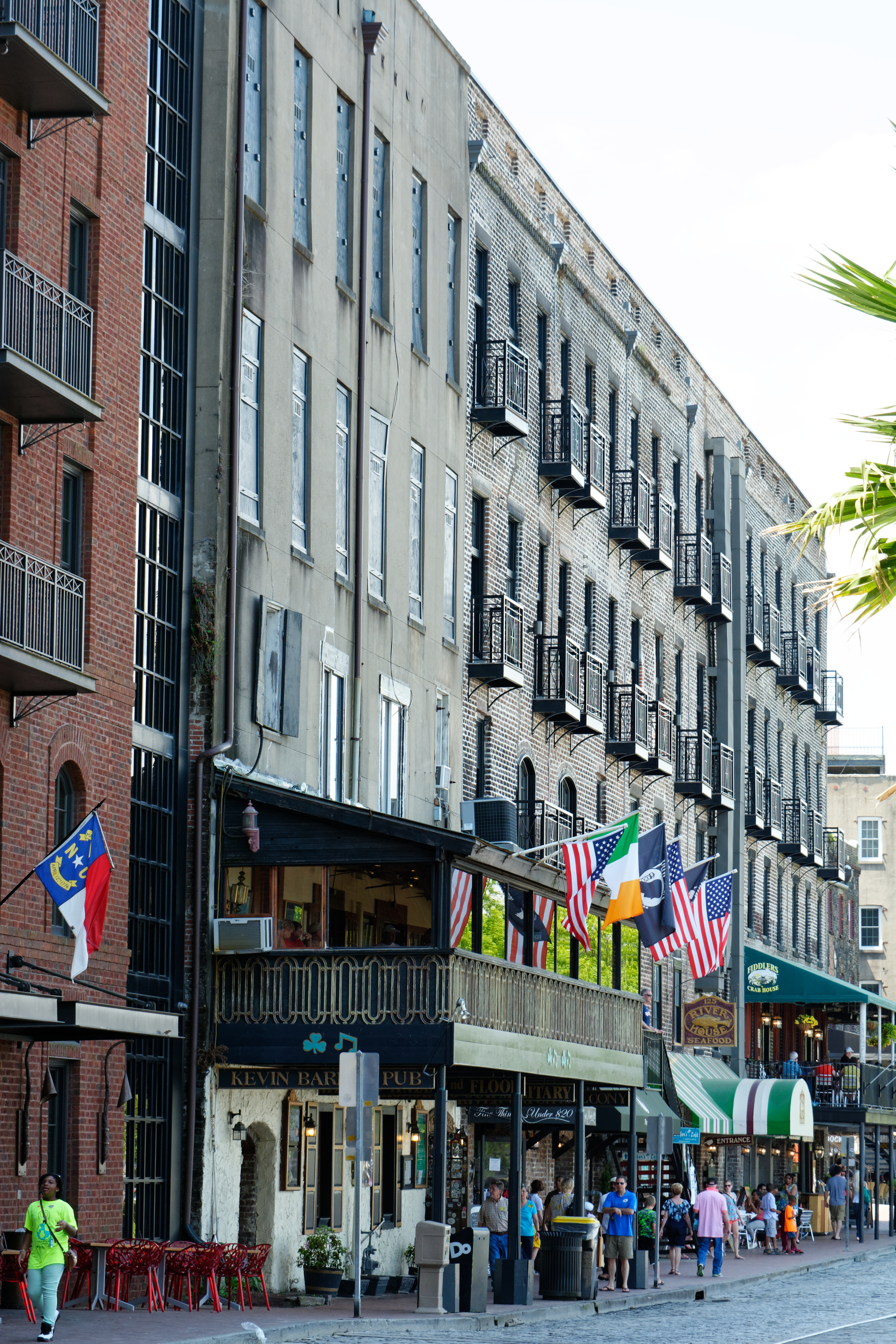
2015

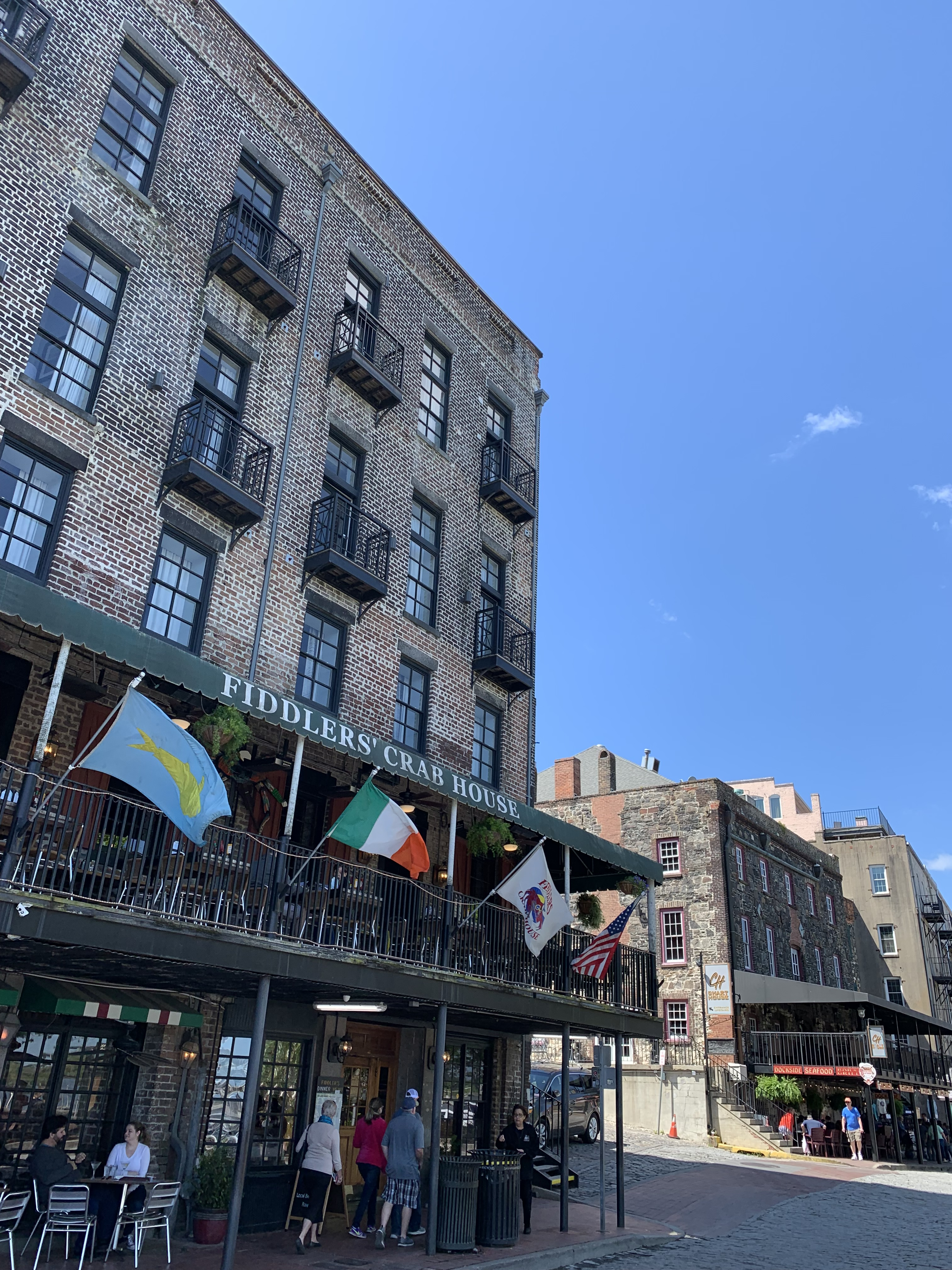
Fiddlers' Crab House, 2019

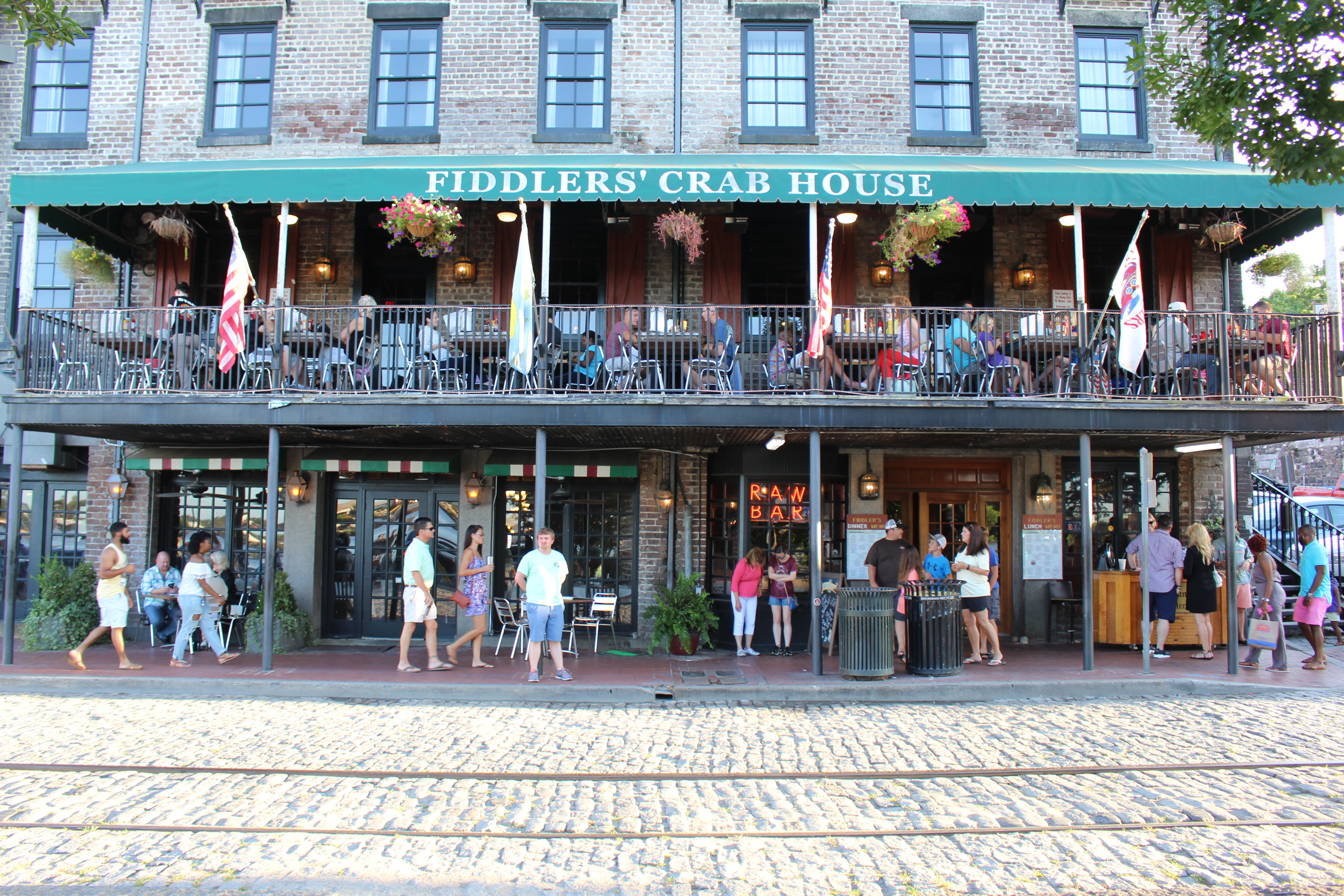
And 2017

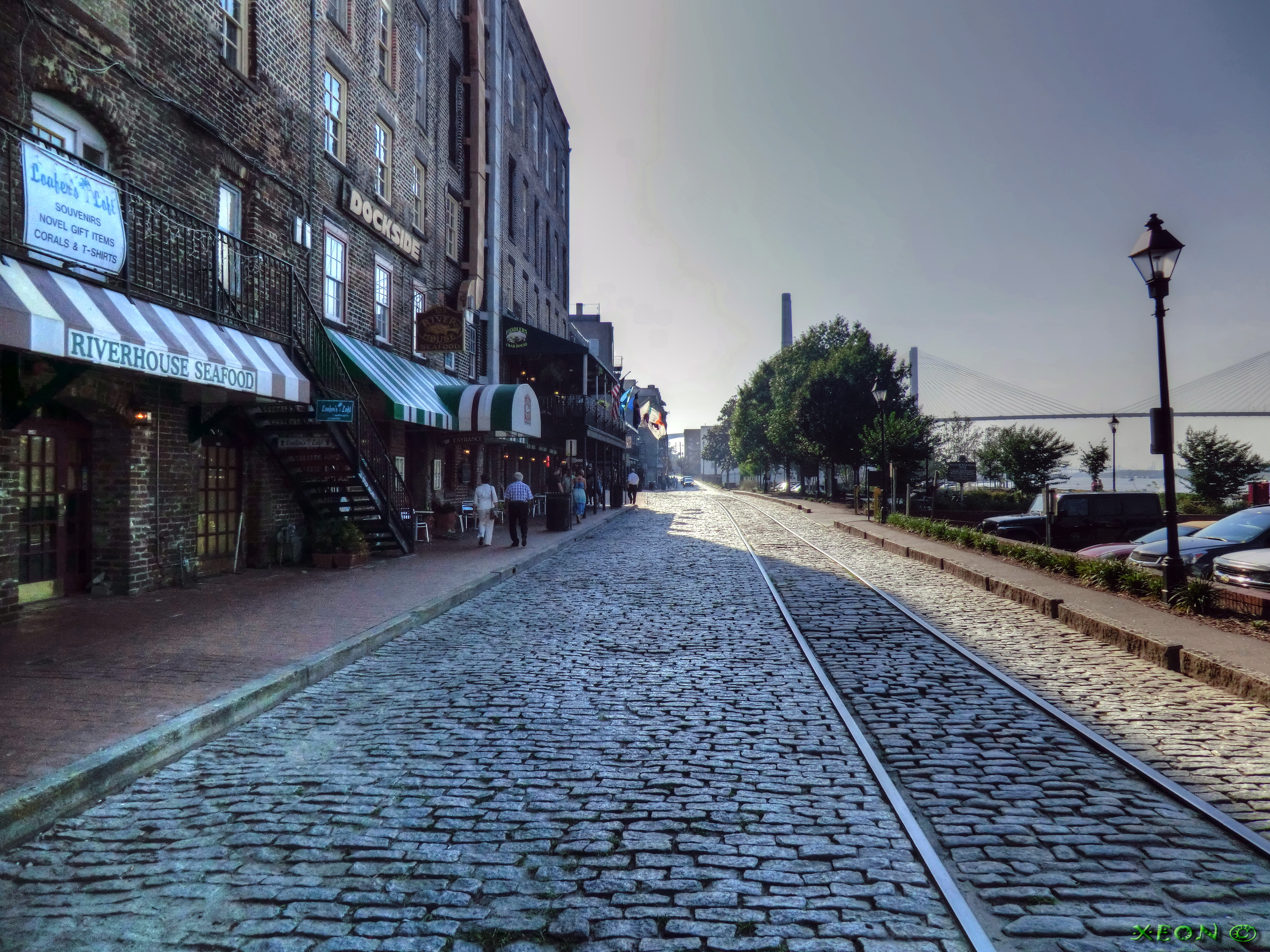
Looking west toward the Talmadge Memorial Bridge, 2013

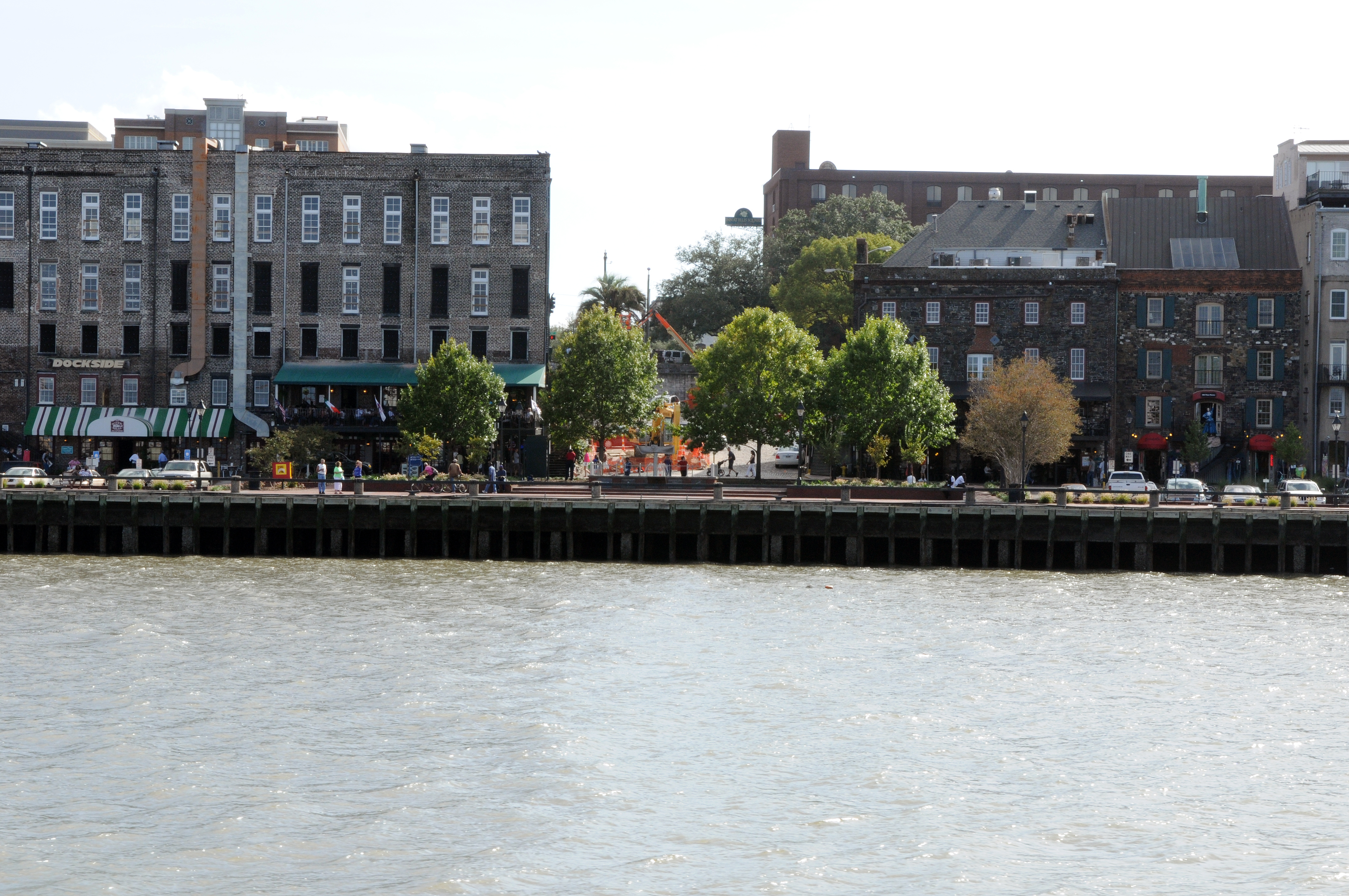
From the Savannah River. The William Taylor Stores are on the right

== See also ==
- Buildings in Savannah Historic District
