= Boar's Head Grill & Tavern =

- The logo, which displays an incorrect year of establishment

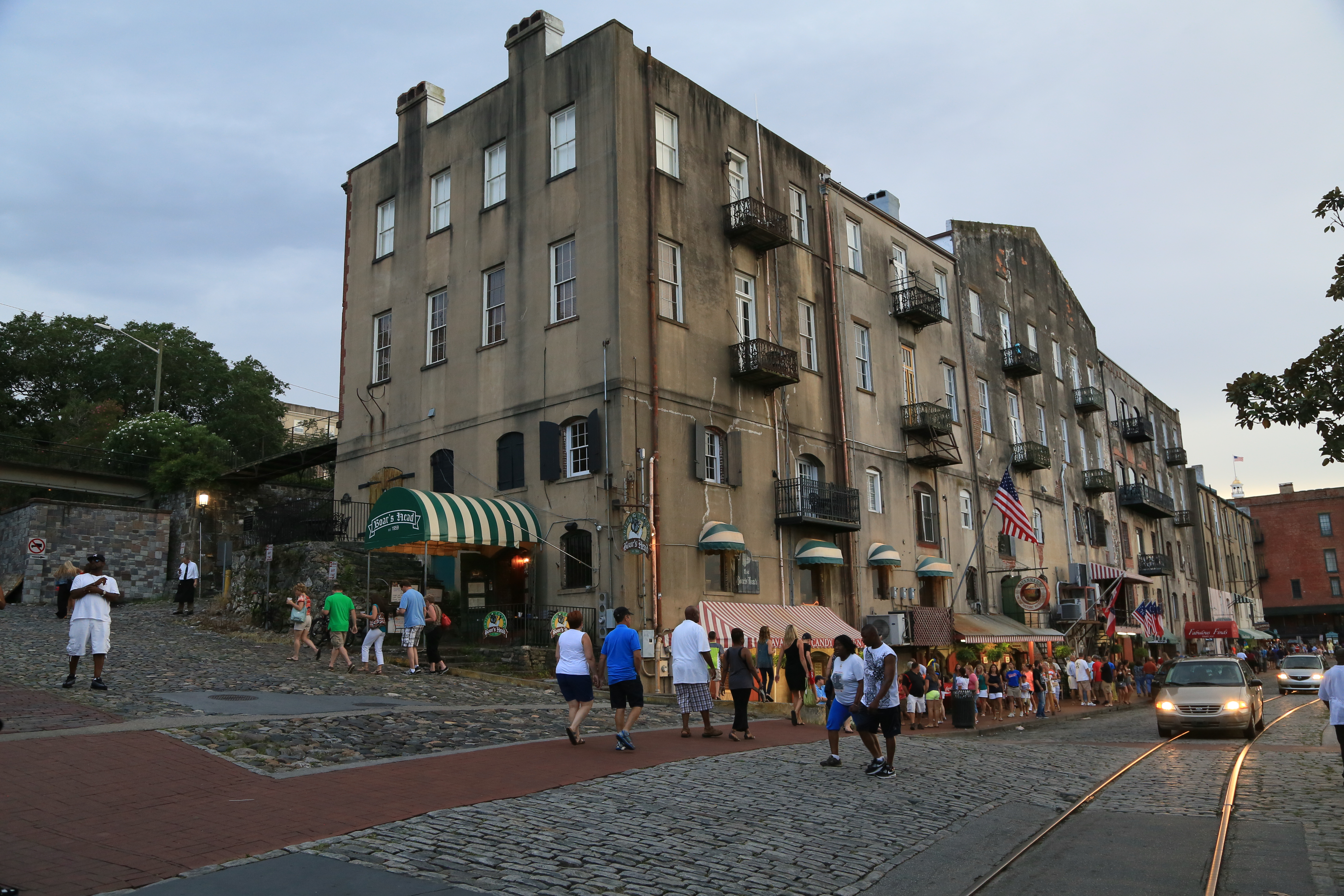
- A view of the restaurant from River Street, 2017
- Interactive map of the Boar's Head Grill & Tavern area

General information
- Location: Savannah, Georgia, U.S., 1 Lincoln Street
- Coordinates: 32.0806939°N 81.0877560°W
- Opened: 1959 (67 years ago)
- Owner: Philip Branan (chef); Charlene Branan

Technical details
- Floor count: 1

Boar's Head Grill & Tavern is a restaurant and bar in Savannah, Georgia, United States. Located on the Lincoln Street ramp, at River Street, the restaurant, established in 1959, occupies the first floor of the Lower Stoddard Range former King Cotton warehouse dating to 1858. It is the oldest restaurant on River Street.

The restaurant's owner/chef is Philip Branan. He and his wife also owned Kevin Barry's Irish Pub, further west on River Street, until its closure in 2020.

A container ship moving west (upstream) along the Savannah River, viewed from the bar of the restaurant
