= Savannah's Candy Kitchen =

Confectionary based in Savannah, GA

Coordinates: 32.0807°N 81.0877°W

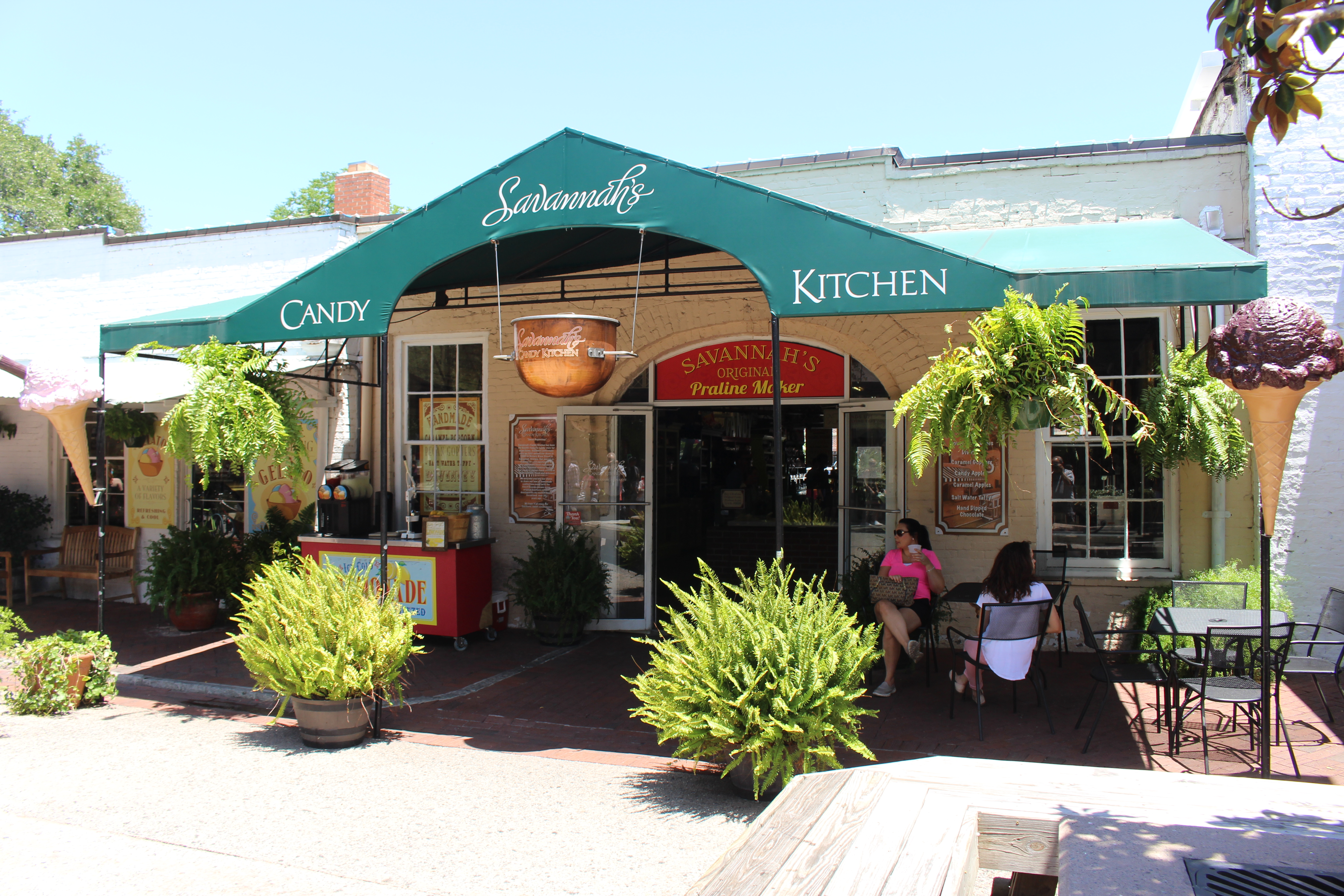
- The store in Savannah's City Market
- Company type: Candy manufacturers
- Founded: 1973 (53 years ago)
- Founders: Stan and Pam Strickland
- Headquarters: 225 East River Street; Savannah, Georgia (flagship store)
- Number of locations: 7
- Revenue: $35 million
- Owners: Stan Strickland; Tonya Strickland; Rhett Strickland
- Website: www.savannahcandy.com

Savannah's Candy Kitchen is a chain of candy manufacturers established in Savannah, Georgia. It was founded in 1973 by Stan and Pam Strickland. Today, it has eight stores around the United States, plus several franchises under the name River Street Sweets, but its flagship store is at 225 East River Street in Savannah. A second Savannah store was opened in the Abraham Minis Building in Franklin Square in City Market. It also has two stores at Hartsfield-Jackson International Airport in Atlanta (Concourse B, opened in 2005; Concourse C, opened in 2012).

The company is the largest producer of praline in the United States.

== History ==
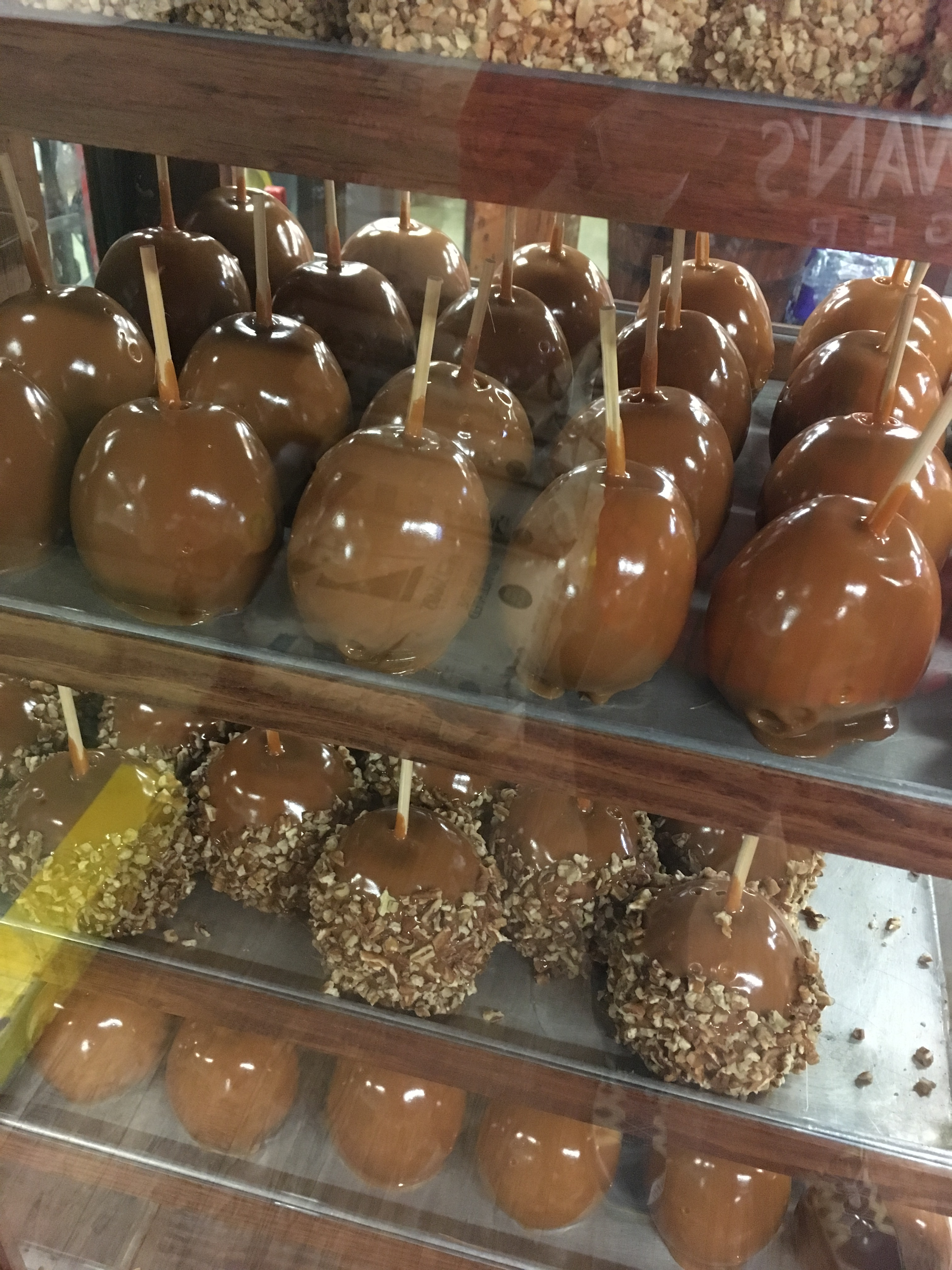
Candied apples on River Street

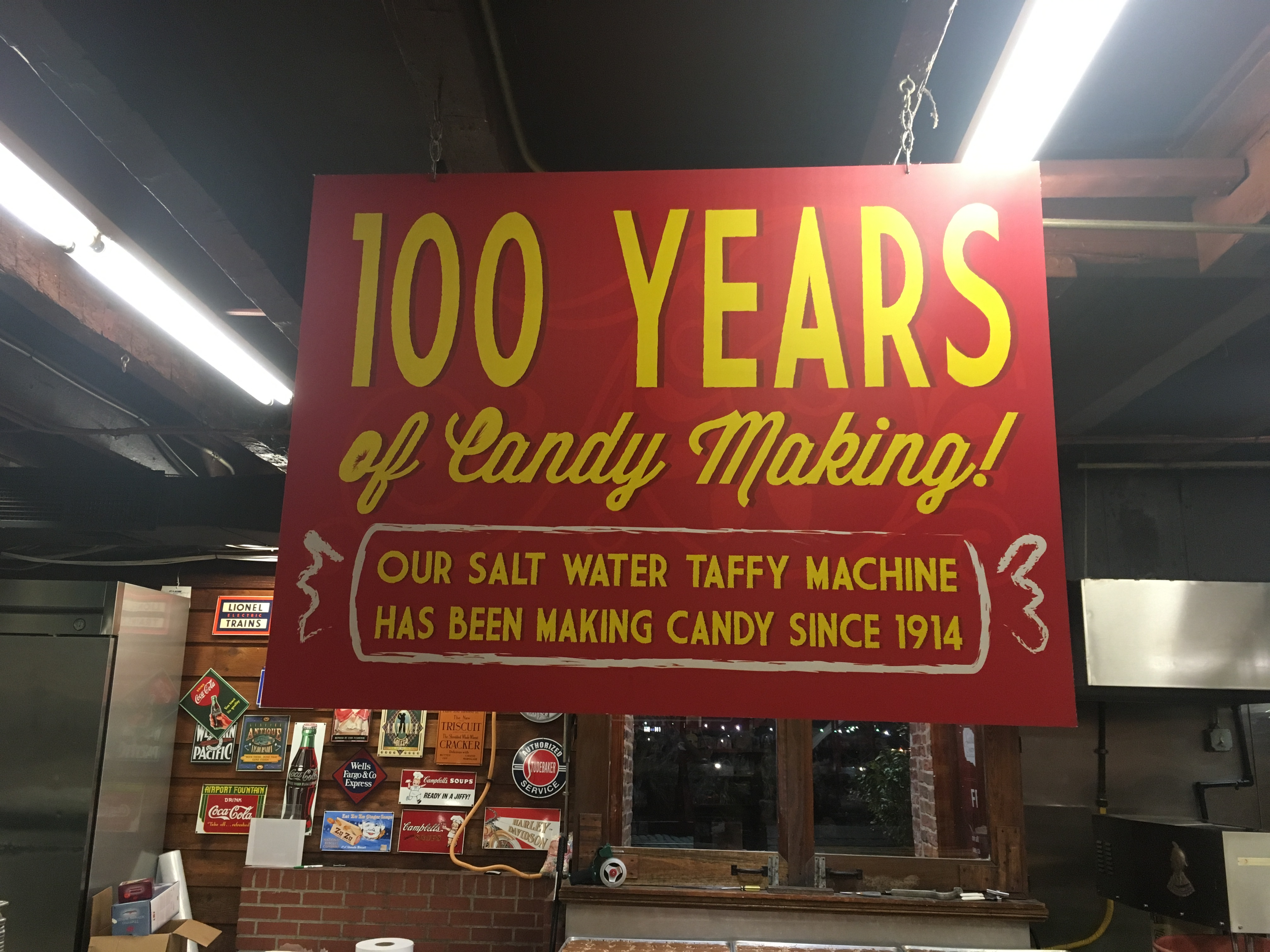
Sign erected at the River Street store in 2014 for the salt water taffy machine's centenary

The machine in action

Stan and Pam Strickland founded River Street Sweets in 1973, having fallen in love with ornaments at Christmas markets in Germany. They soon realized that selling candy year-round was a mistake, however. Rent was $50 a month, and they had trouble making it. To help make ends meet, Pam became a teacher, then a librarian, and Stan a wine salesman. In the meantime, they tried to sell the store but could not. They bought some pralines while in Charleston, South Carolina, and customers bought them from their store. They went to a gift show in Atlanta a short time later, in 1978. Their son, Tim, found a fudge-making machine, which his parents bought.

The Stricklands looked for recipes to make praline. Stan would man the stove, and make some in a saucepan. One night, they made three pieces of candy, put it on wax paper, "and boy, it was good," said Stan. They then found out they could make pralines in the fudge-making machine, despite recommendations from the manufacturer against doing so, warning that it could kill somebody.

Stan purchased a slab of marble, weighing about 800 pounds (360 kg), from a local stonemason on which to let the hot pralines cool. After making a batch, some customers walked in and could smell the candy being made.

In 1991, the Stricklands got divorced and split the company and the family. Pam got the original name and two stores; Stan got two stores (Atlanta and Orlando) and later opened a rival company, Savannah's Candy Kitchen, also on River Street. Their children, Jennifer and Tim, worked exclusively for Pam, and the family did not speak for about twenty years.

In 1996, the company expanded and moved part of their production into a factory outside of town to handle its mail orders. It now uses one in Savannah, in a 75,000 square feet (7,000 m^{2}) facility.

The business expanded outside of Savannah for the first time in 2003, when it opened an outlet in Charleston.

Around 2008, Jennifer and Tim broke the silence and began communicating with their father. Seven years later, Savannah's Candy Kitchen and River Street Sweets merged brand names. The first franchise location opened at the Tanger Outlet Mall in Pooler, Georgia. As of 2016, sales of the combined entities were $35 million. They make 4,000 pounds (1,800 kg) of pralines a day (the most in the United States), and between 5,000 pounds (2,300 kg) and 7,000 pounds (3,200 kg) of candy per day in total. Some products were not a success, including chocolate-covered bananas.

As of 2019, the business has been in the Strickland family for three generations, and is now the largest candy store in the South.

Above the River Street entrance to the Candy Kitchen hangs a copper kettle. Inside the store there is a salt water taffy machine that dates to 1914.

== Current locations ==
=== Savannah's Candy Kitchen ===
Georgia

- River Street, Savannah
- 312 West Julian Street, Savannah
- Hartsfield-Jackson International Airport, Atlanta (two locations)

South Carolina

- Market Street, Charleston

Tennessee

- Broadway, Nashville

Maryland

- American Way, Oxon Hill
