= Archibald Smith Stores =

Historic building in Georgia

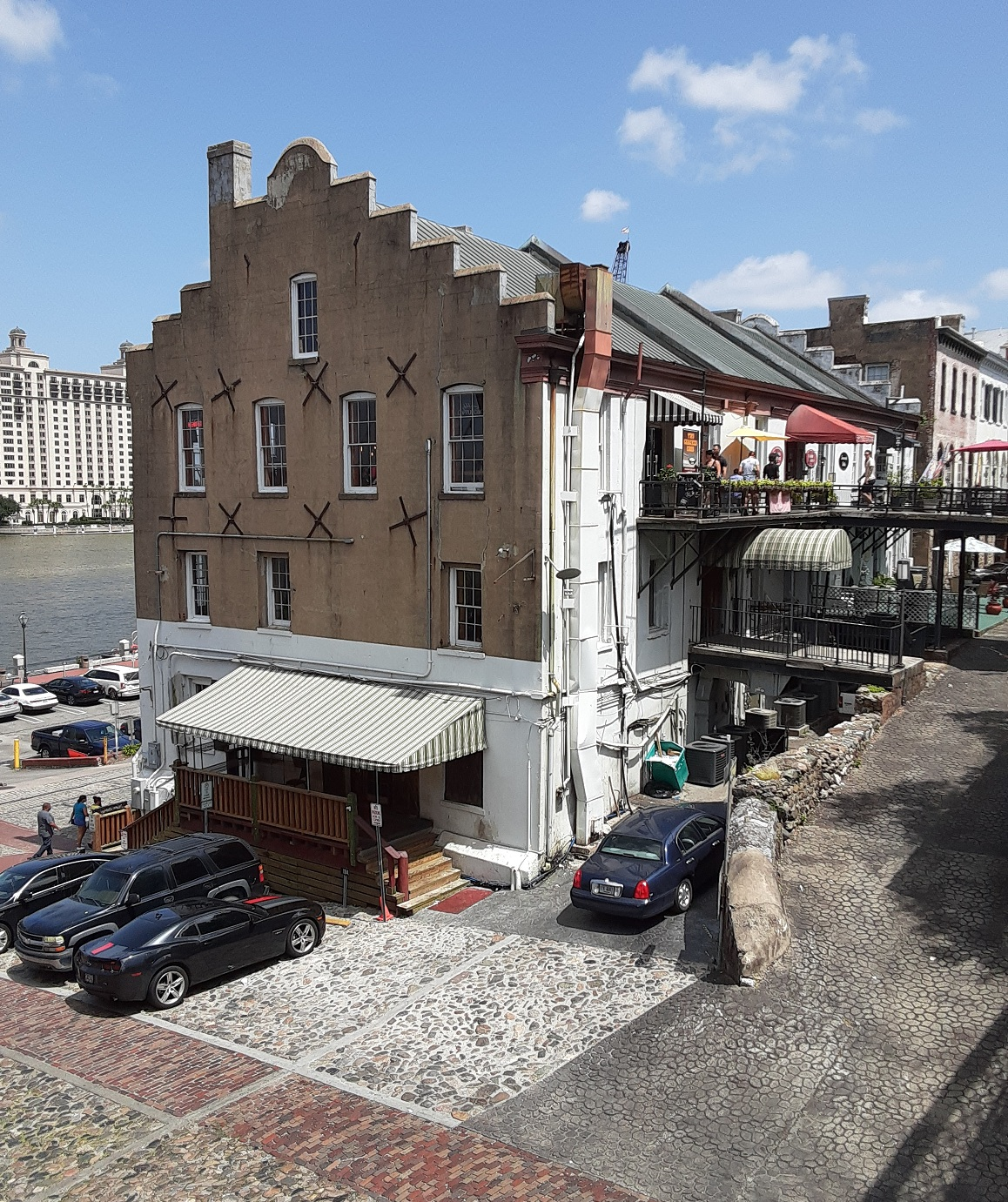
- The building in 2021, viewed from East Bay Street. The structure’s earthquake bolts, which run the length of the building, are clearly visible in the side gable
- Interactive map of the Archibald Smith Stores area

General information
- Location: 202–206 East Bay Street, Savannah, Georgia, United States
- Coordinates: 32.0808°N 81.0885°W
- Completed: 1810 (216 years ago)

Technical details
- Floor count: 3–4

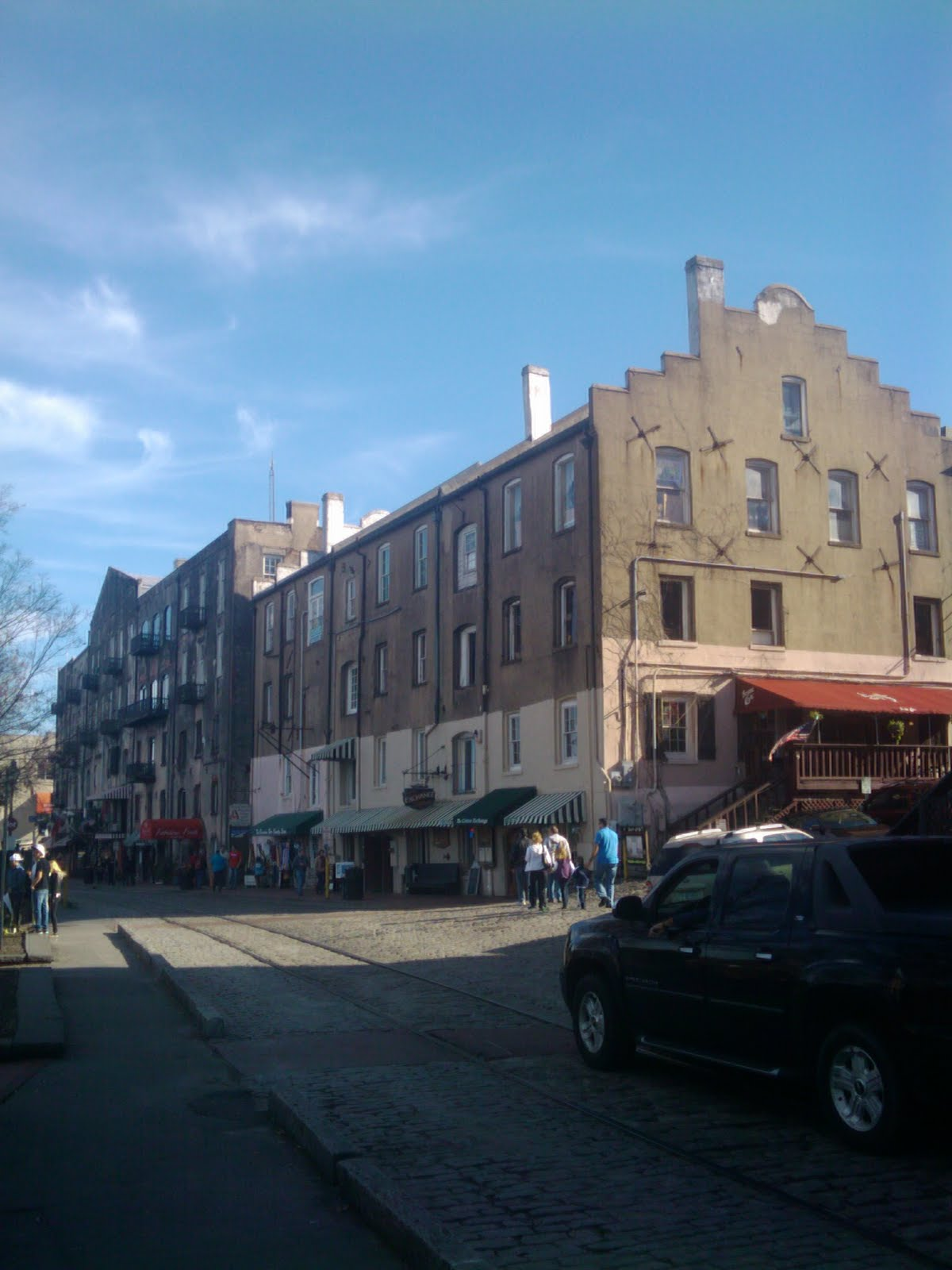
View from River Street in 2011

Archibald Smith Stores is a historic building in Savannah, Georgia, United States. Located in Savannah's Historic District, the addresses of some of the properties are East Bay Street, above Factors Walk, while others solely utilize the former King Cotton warehouses on River Street (as of February 2022, these are the Cinnamon Bear Country Store and the Cotton Exchange Tavern). The building was constructed in 1810, making it the oldest intact structure on East River Street. It was expanded in 1816. Due to the building's height, it is at this point (if travelling from the east) that Factors Walk changes from being single-level to become two levels.

The building stands adjacent to Lower Stoddard Range, the two separated only by steps leading to and from River Street and Factors Walk.

In September 1804, the building was one of several damaged (albeit "very partially") in the Antigua–Charleston hurricane. Some stores were swept away.

Archibald Smith was a member of Savannah's city council at the turn of the 18th century. He lived at 48 East Broad Street, a home built prior to 1830.

== See also ==
- Buildings in Savannah Historic District
