= Upper Stoddard Range =

Historic building in Georgia

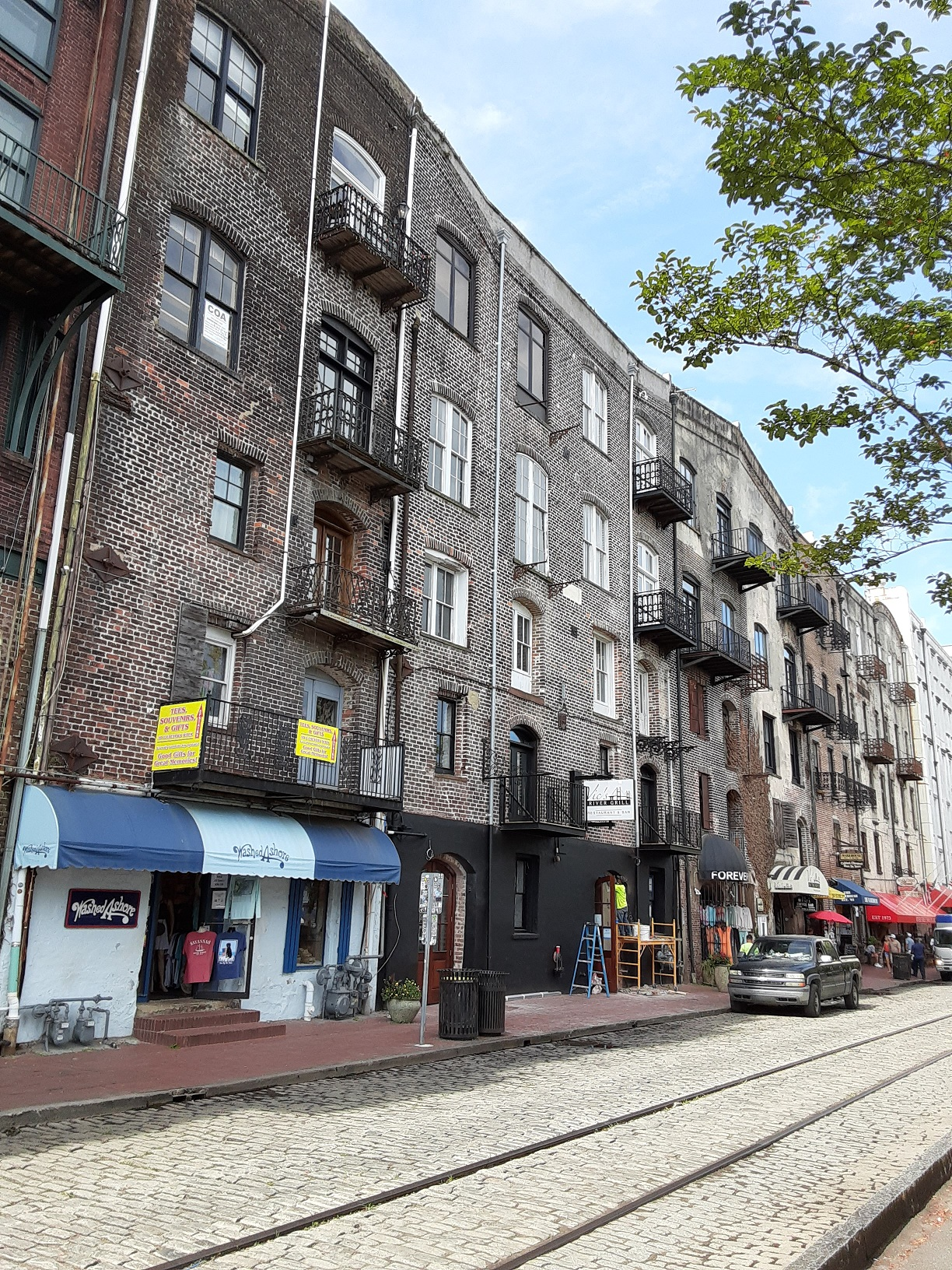
- The former King Cotton warehouses on River Street, looking west
- Interactive map of the Upper Stoddard Range area

General information
- Location: 12–42 East Bay Street, Savannah, Georgia, United States
- Coordinates: 32.0811°N 81.0899°W
- Completed: 1859 (167 years ago)

Technical details
- Floor count: 5

Upper Stoddard Range is a historic range of buildings in Savannah, Georgia, United States. Located in Savannah's Historic District, the addresses of some of the properties are East Bay Street, above Factors Walk, while others solely utilize the former King Cotton warehouses on River Street. As of February 2022, the businesses occupying the ground floor of the River Street elevation are: Washed Ashore, Vic's River Grill, Vic's on the River, Sona's Souvenir & Gifts, The Warehouse Bar & Grille and River Street Sweets Candy Store.

The building was constructed by 1859 by John Stoddard (1809–1879), replacing Mongin Wharf.

Factors Harney & Co. were operating their general commission and shipping merchants enterprise from "12 Stoddard's Upper Range" in 1868.

The buildings that comprise Lower Stoddard Range are at 208–230 East Bay Street, to the east of the upper range.

== Gallery ==
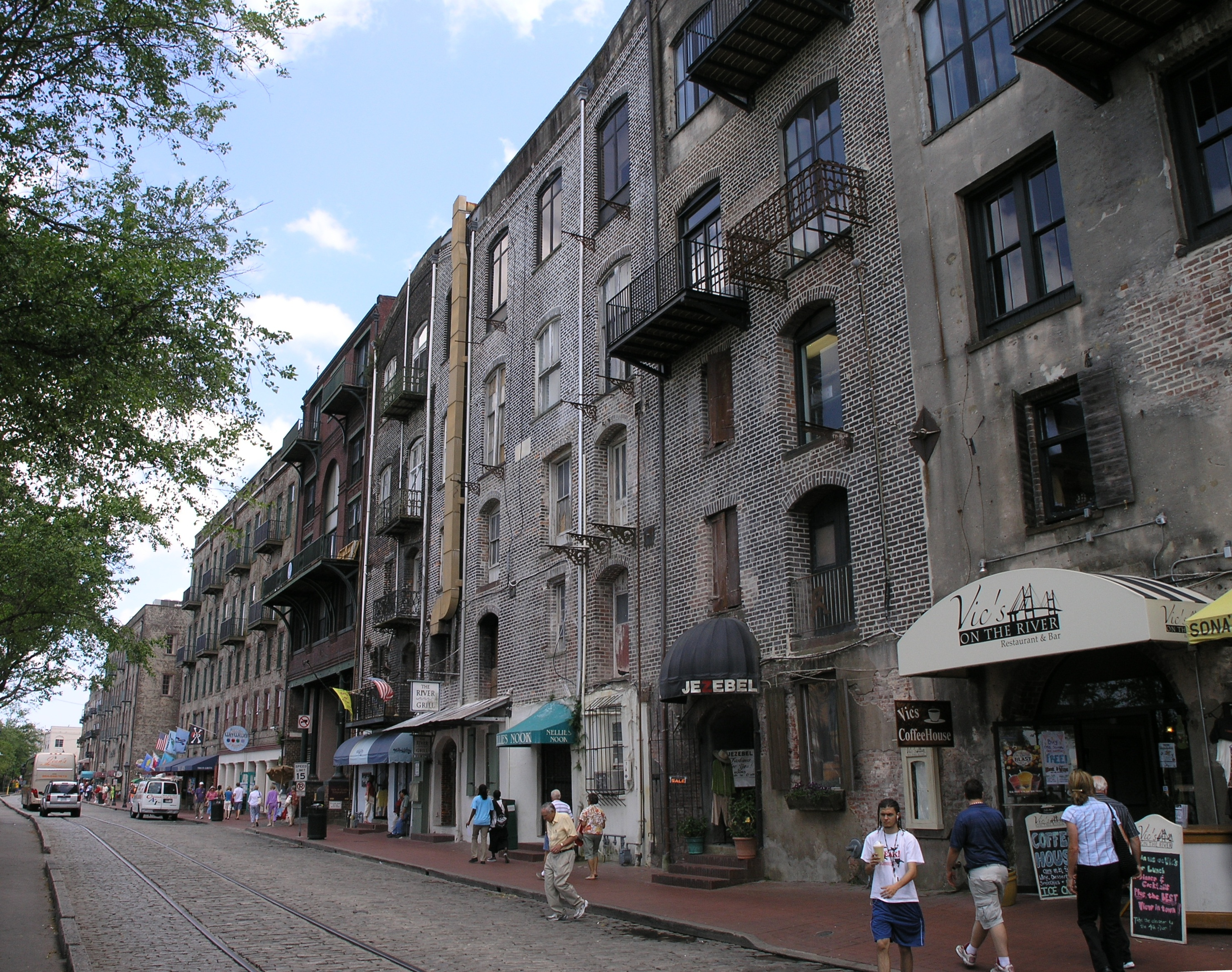
The eastern end of the range on River Street in 2007

== See also ==
- Buildings in Savannah Historic District
