= Hyatt Regency Savannah =

Hotel in Savannah, Georgia

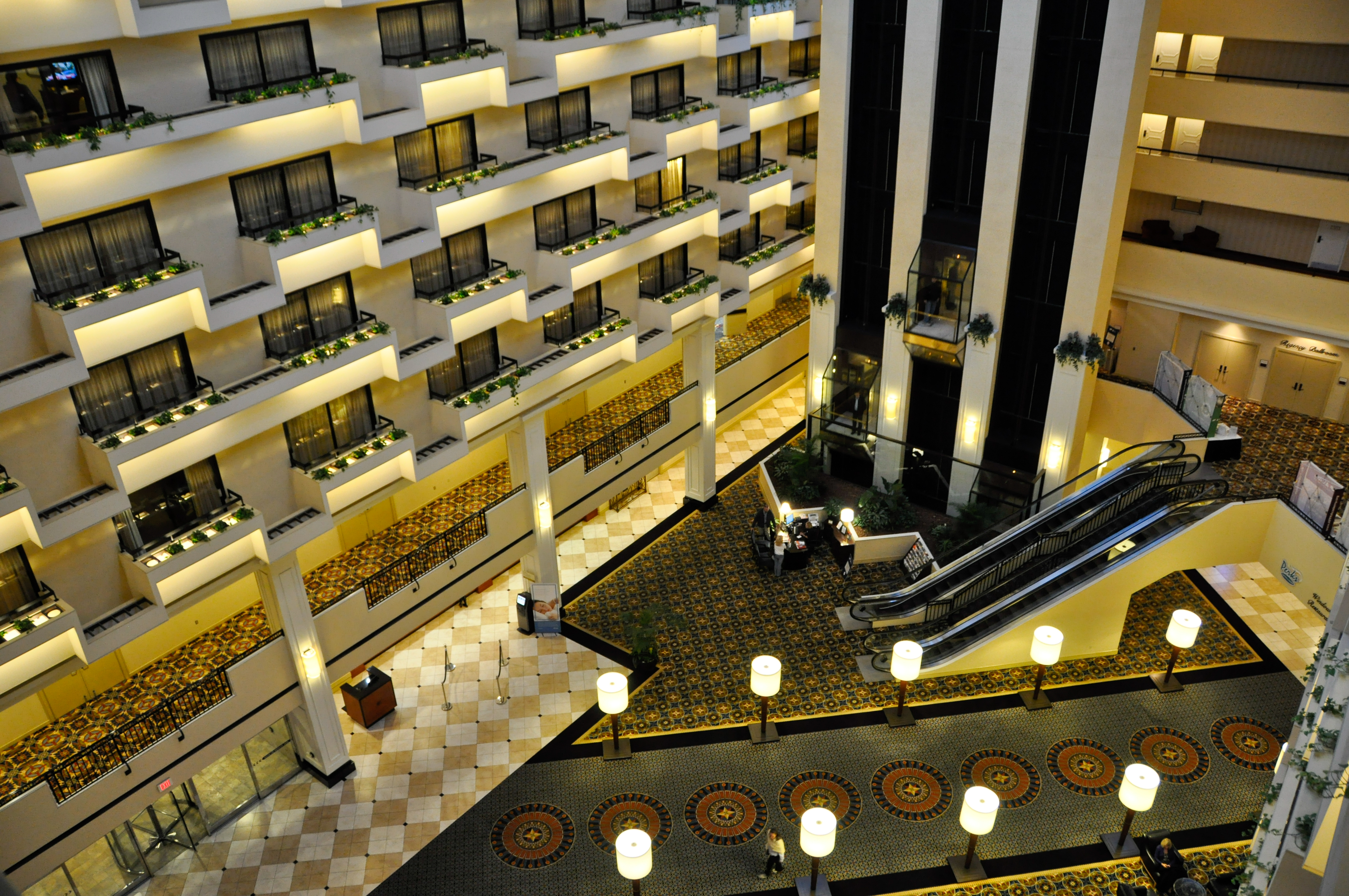
- The building's lobby in 2011
- Interactive map of the Hyatt Regency Savannah area
- Hotel chain: Hyatt Regency

General information
- Status: Completed
- Type: Hotel
- Location: 2 West Bay Street; Savannah, Georgia, U.S.
- Coordinates: 32.0816°N 81.0915°W
- Completed: 1980; 46 years ago

Technical details
- Floor count: 6

Design and construction
- Developer: Merritt Dixon

Website
- Official website

Hyatt Regency Savannah is a high-rise hotel in Savannah, Georgia. Built in 1980, it stands adjacent to Savannah City Hall at Bay Street's downtown midsection.

Originally envisioned as a 14-story structure in Savannah's Historic District, a long battle with the Historic Savannah Foundation concluded with a compromise being reached of its being limited to six storeys. Another source of controversy is that it bridged River Street, physically dividing the waterfront in two, although the air rights were actually a remnant of the preceding structure, the Wilcox and Gibbs Guano Company. A tunnel allows pedestrian and vehicle access along the street.

== Facilities ==
The hotel has a swimming pool, a fitness center and a lounge.

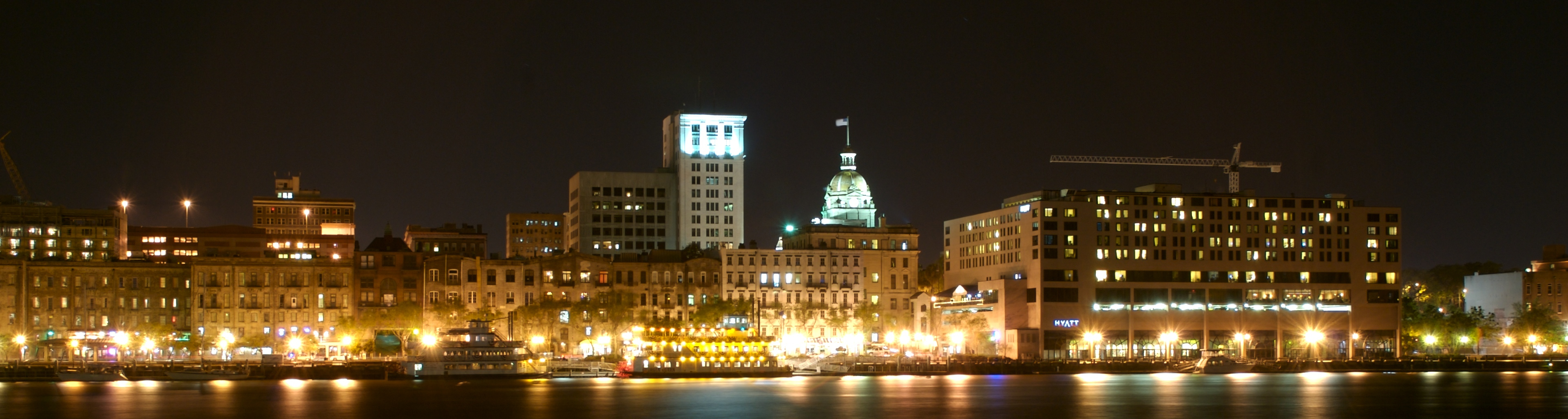
The hotel is to the right of City Hall in this view south over the Savannah River

== Waterfront location ==
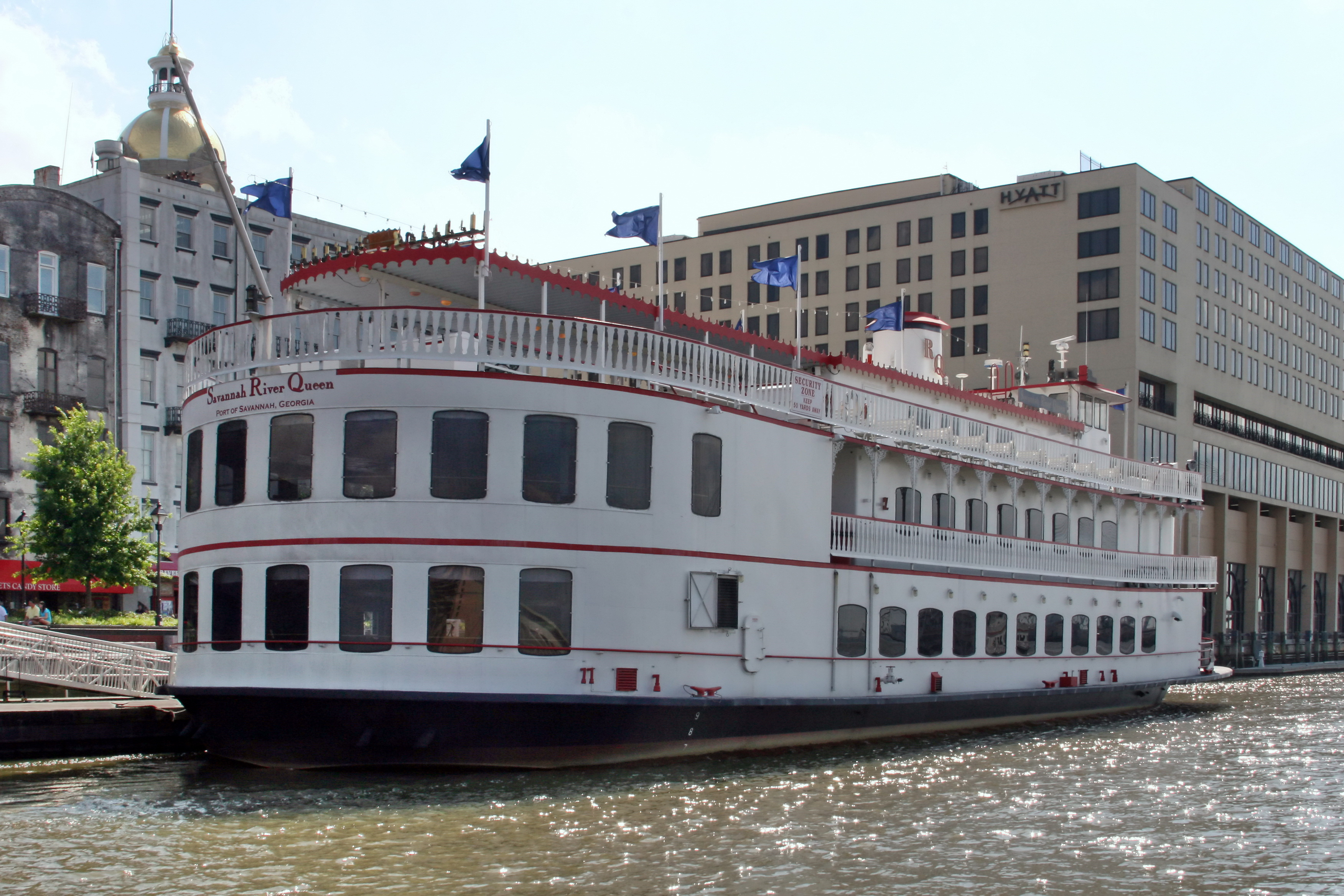
The rear of the hotel spanning River Street, with the Savannah River Queen in the foreground

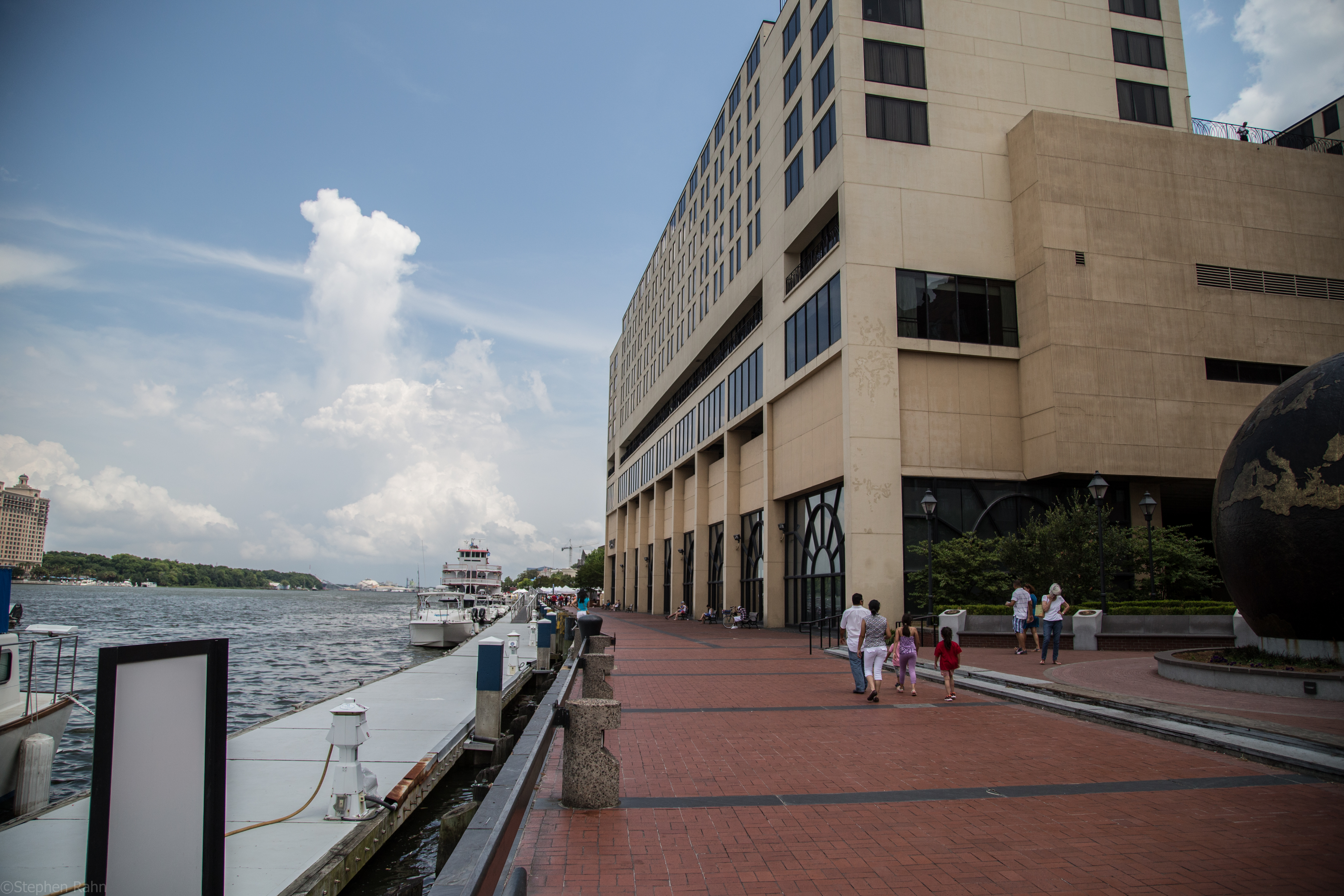
Looking east

== Previous structures ==
Long before the site became occupied by the hotel, two ranges of buildings — Bolton Range and Habersham & Harris Range — stood on the lot, part of Commerce Row. These buildings were replaced by the Neal Blun Building, which stood between 1889 and 1969, and (to the west) the M. Ferst and Company grocery store. The Ferst building was completed in September 1888, but Moses Ferst, a native of Bavaria, died eleven months later, aged 60.

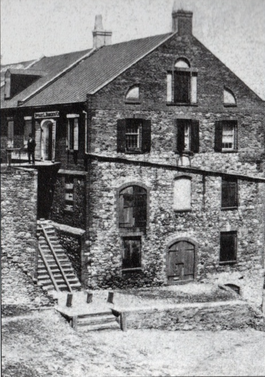
Bolton Range, circa 1880s, looking northwest

Habersham and Company, southern façade. The company was in business between 1764 and 1899

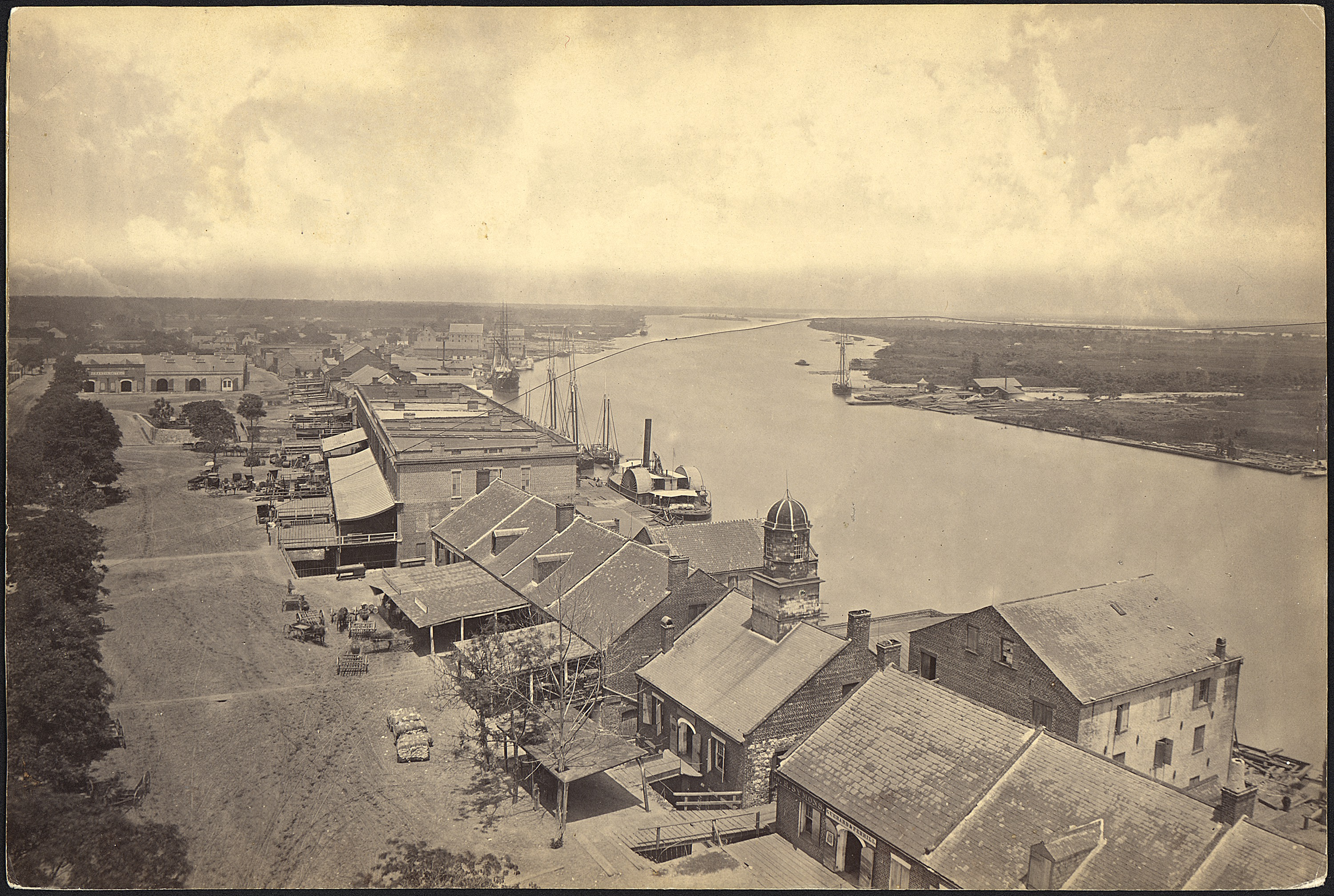
A c. 1863 view
