= River Street (Savannah, Georgia) =

Street in Savannah, Georgia, United States

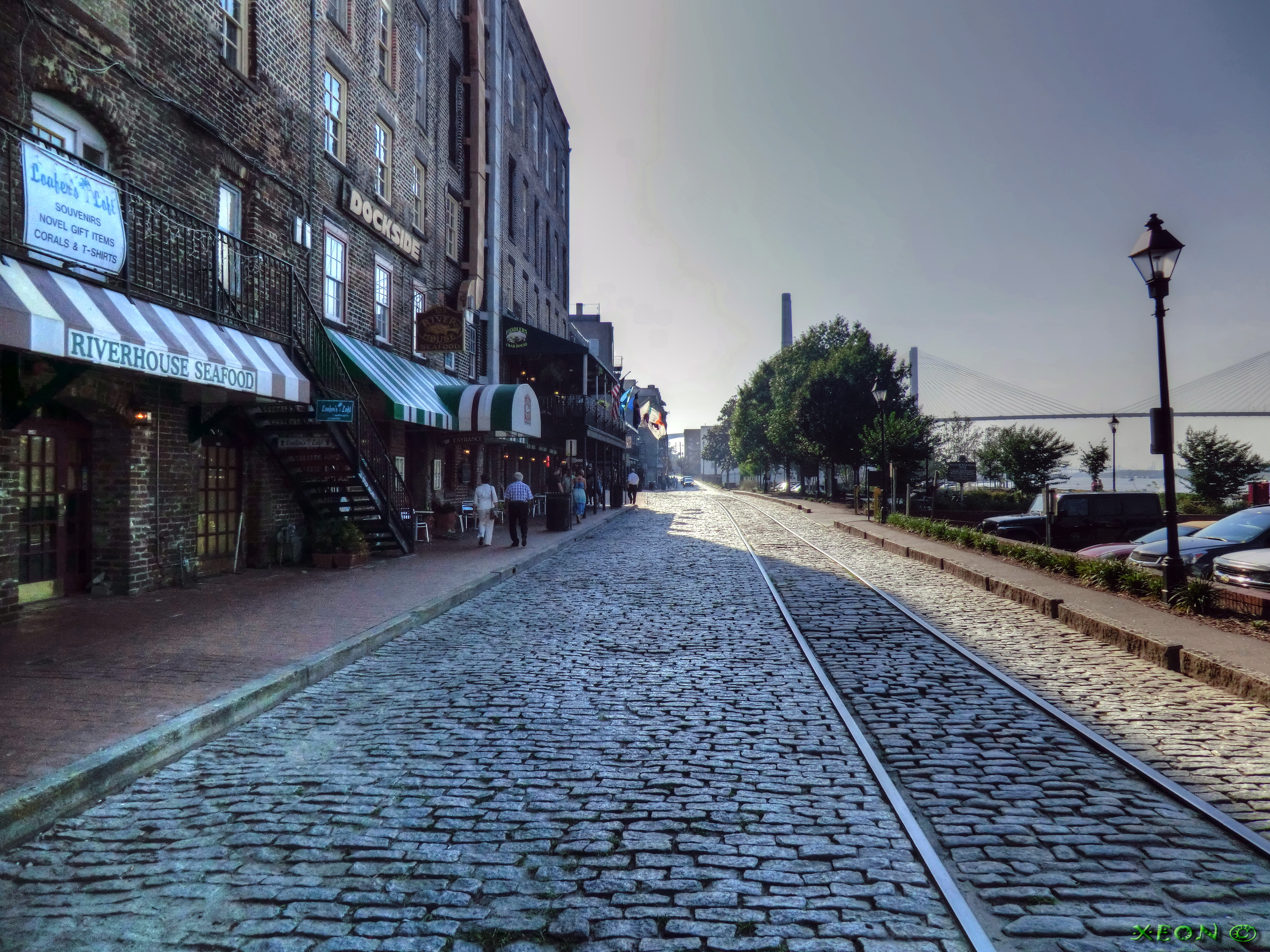
- Looking west along River Street to the Talmadge Memorial Bridge from in front of the Jones and Telfair Range, 2013
- Interactive map of River Street
- Namesake: Savannah River
- Length: 2.0 mi (3.2 km)
- Location: Savannah, Georgia, U.S.
- West end: North and East Lathrop Ave
- East end: East Bay Street

River Street is a commercial street and promenade in Savannah, Georgia, United States. It runs along the southern edge of the Savannah River for 2 miles (3.2 km), from the merging of North and East Lathrop Avenues in the west to East Bay Street in the east. Its most well-known section runs from the Talmadge Memorial Bridge, then continues below City Hall and Yamacraw Bluff to its eastern terminus. It is West River Street up to where the Hyatt Regency Savannah spans it. It is here, around 40 feet (12 m) below Bay Street, that it becomes East River Street. The street is one-way (westbound) from Martin Luther King Jr. Boulevard.

Today, East River Street consists largely of restaurants, cafés and craft shops, and is one of the city's major tourist attractions. Its half-mile-long pedestrian promenade, the John P. Rousakis Riverfront Plaza, is named for Savannah's longest-serving mayor (1970–1992).

At its downtown stretch, the street's southern side is populated by terraces of former King Cotton warehouses, the industrial rear portions of the more fashionable Bay Street frontages. Factors Row, a bluffside row of red-brick buildings where cotton brokers bargained during the product's heyday, helps preserve this industry in its name. Factors Walk is "built on the middle level of a sloping bluff with warehouses beneath and Bay Street above." The warehouses were also used as holding cells for African slaves.

== Transportation ==
A container ship moving west (upstream) along River Street

The River Street Streetcar, a heritage streetcar line, served six stops between Montgomery Street and East Broad Street from 2009 to 2015. The lines, set into the street's Belgian block paving, were originally used by horsecars, then streetcars (between 1890 and 1946). The Norfolk Southern Railway had owned the River Street branch line for years, operating the River Street Rambler, a local freight train, until 2003. The City of Savannah purchased the River Street Branch line right-of-way from Norfolk Southern in 2004 for approximately $600,000.

Old Town Trolley Tours has a stop (number 10 of 15) on River Street below Factors Walk. Old Savannah Tours has two stops on River Street: one close to Old Town's stop and the other at the marketplace further east.

There are no city bus stops on River Street. The nearest ones are at Congress and Jefferson, Johnson Square, and Lincoln and Congress, which are all served by Chatham Area Transit's fare-free DOT (Downtown Transportation) "downtown loop" (route 7D) service. Lincoln Street ramp leads down to East River Street beside the western end of Factors Walk.

Several riverboats are berthed beside River Street, including the Belles Ferry, the PS Georgia Queen and the PS Savannah River Queen.

Large tankers and container ships proceeding to and returning from the Port of Savannah west of the city sometimes pass within yards of the promenade.

In 2020, Plant Riverside District, a largescale mixed-use development, opened on the west end of the street.

== Popular culture ==
River Street is a location visited in the 2012 video game The Walking Dead.

== Architecture ==
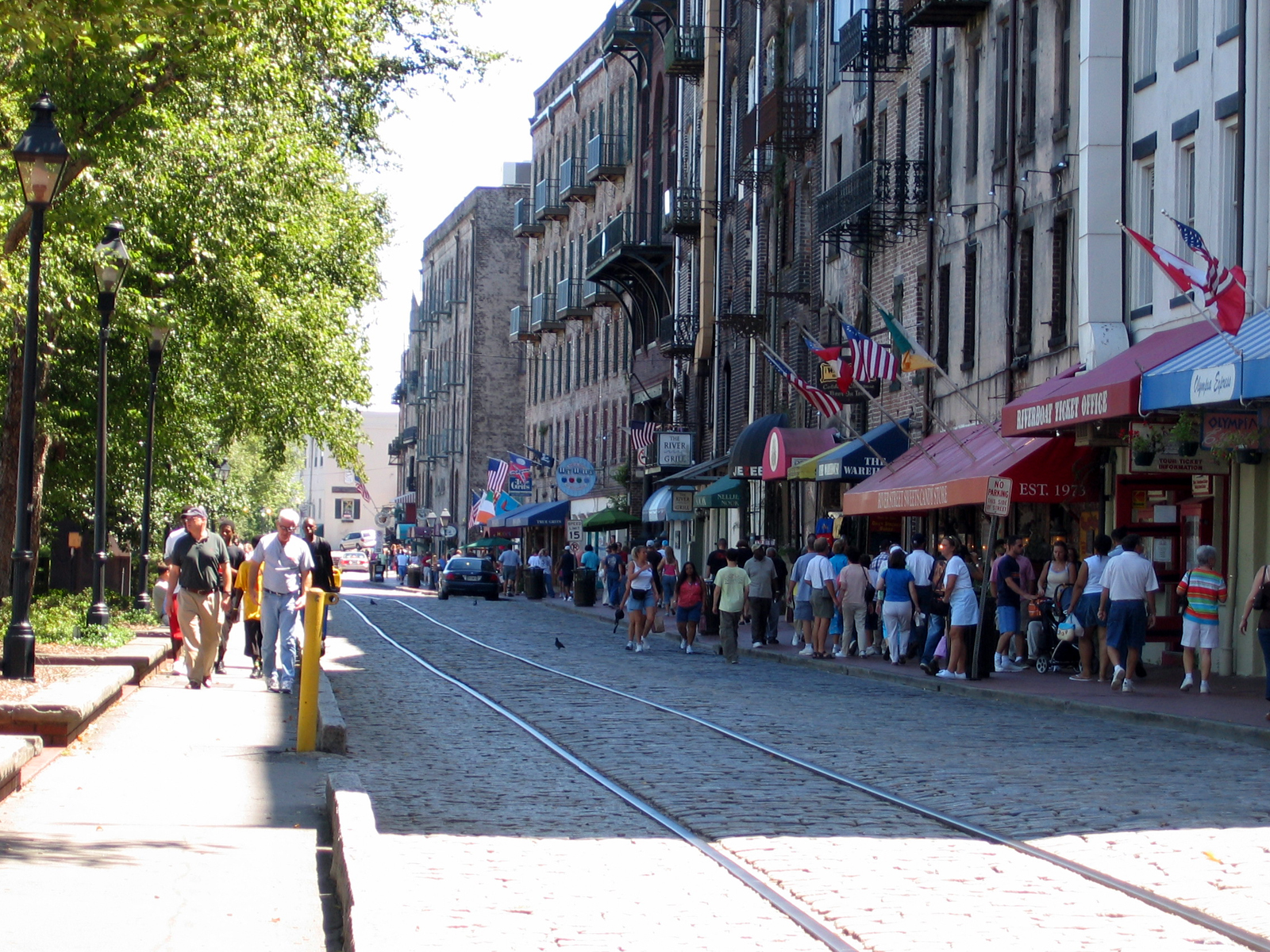
Upper Stoddard Range, 2005

The following buildings, while having frontages on Bay Street, have businesses working out of their River Street elevations. Ordered from west to east:

West River Street

- John Williamson Range, 302–310 West Bay Street (1819)
- Johnston Range, 220–230 West Bay Street (1823)
- Lowden Building, 214 West Bay Street (1910)
- William Taylor Stores, 202–206 West Bay Street (1806/1818)
- Jones and Telfair Range, 112–130 West Bay Street (1852–1854)
- Hyatt Regency Savannah, 2 West Bay Street (1980)

East River Street

- Thomas Gamble Building, 4–10 East Bay Street (1877)
- Upper Stoddard Range, 12–42 East Bay Street (1859)
- Claghorn and Cunningham Range, 102–110 East Bay Street (1857)
- Jones/Derenne Range, 112–130 East Bay Street (1857)
- Archibald Smith Stores, 202–206 East Bay Street (1810)
- Lower Stoddard Range, 208–230 East Bay Street (1858)
- Scott and Balfour Stores, 302–316 East Bay Street (1858)
- George Anderson Stores, 402–410 East Bay Street (1823/1850s)
- Olde Harbour Inn, 504–516 East Bay Street (1892)

Long before the site became occupied by the Hyatt Regency in 1981, two ranges of buildings — Bolton Range and Habersham & Harris Range — stood on the lot. These buildings were replaced by the Neal Blun Building, which stood between 1889 and 1969, and (to the west of it) the Moses Ferst and Company grocery store.

The 1890 Commercial Row, and its adjoining structures, were knocked down around 1970. What had been the most tight-knit block of River Street, it subsequently lay empty for all of the 1970s, eventually filled by the John P. Rousakis Riverfront Plaza and the Hyatt Regency.

== Gallery ==
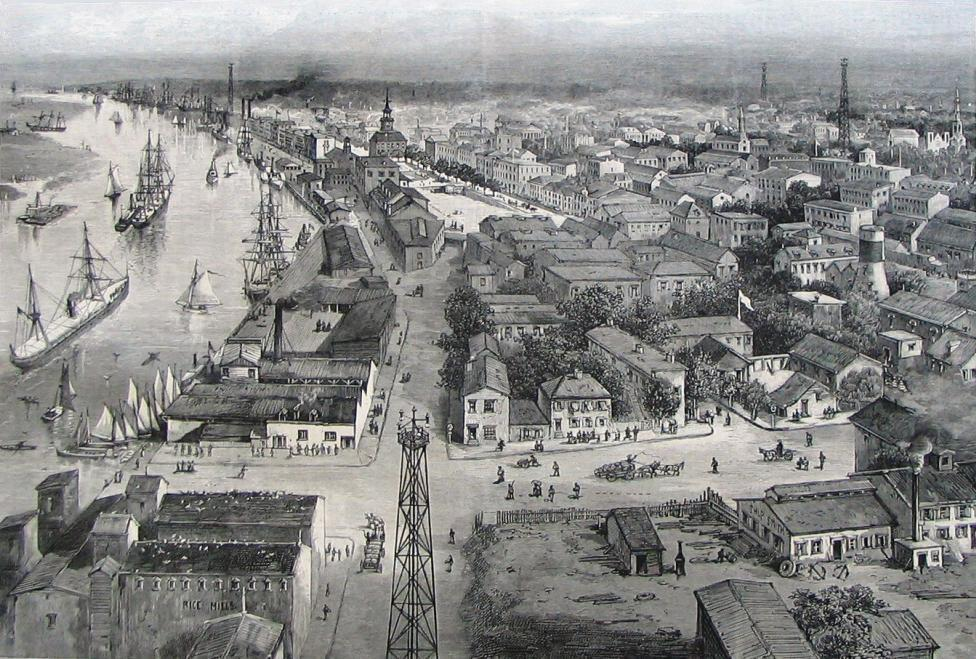
A 19th-century view of the wharves

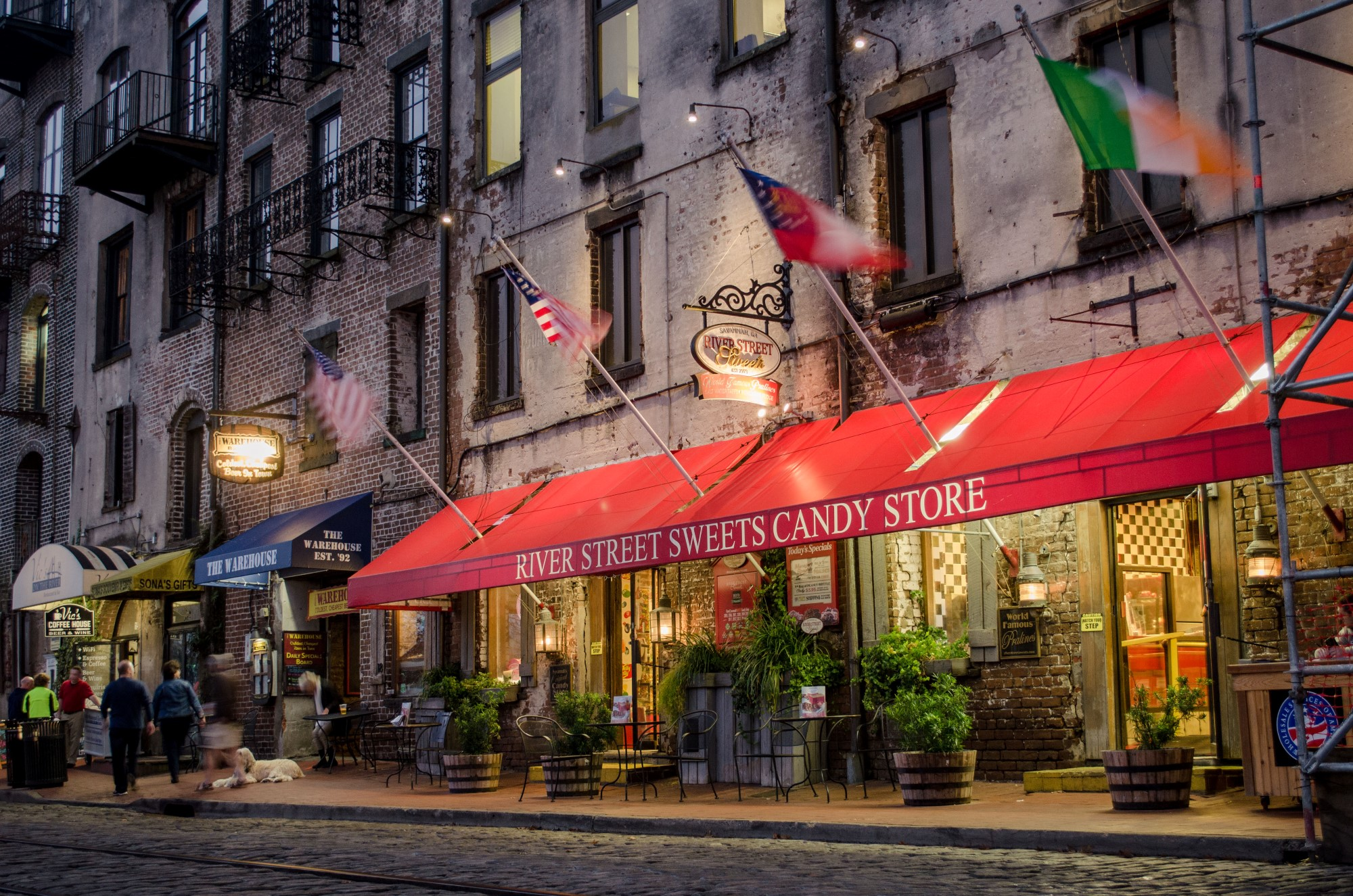
River Street businesses in 2016

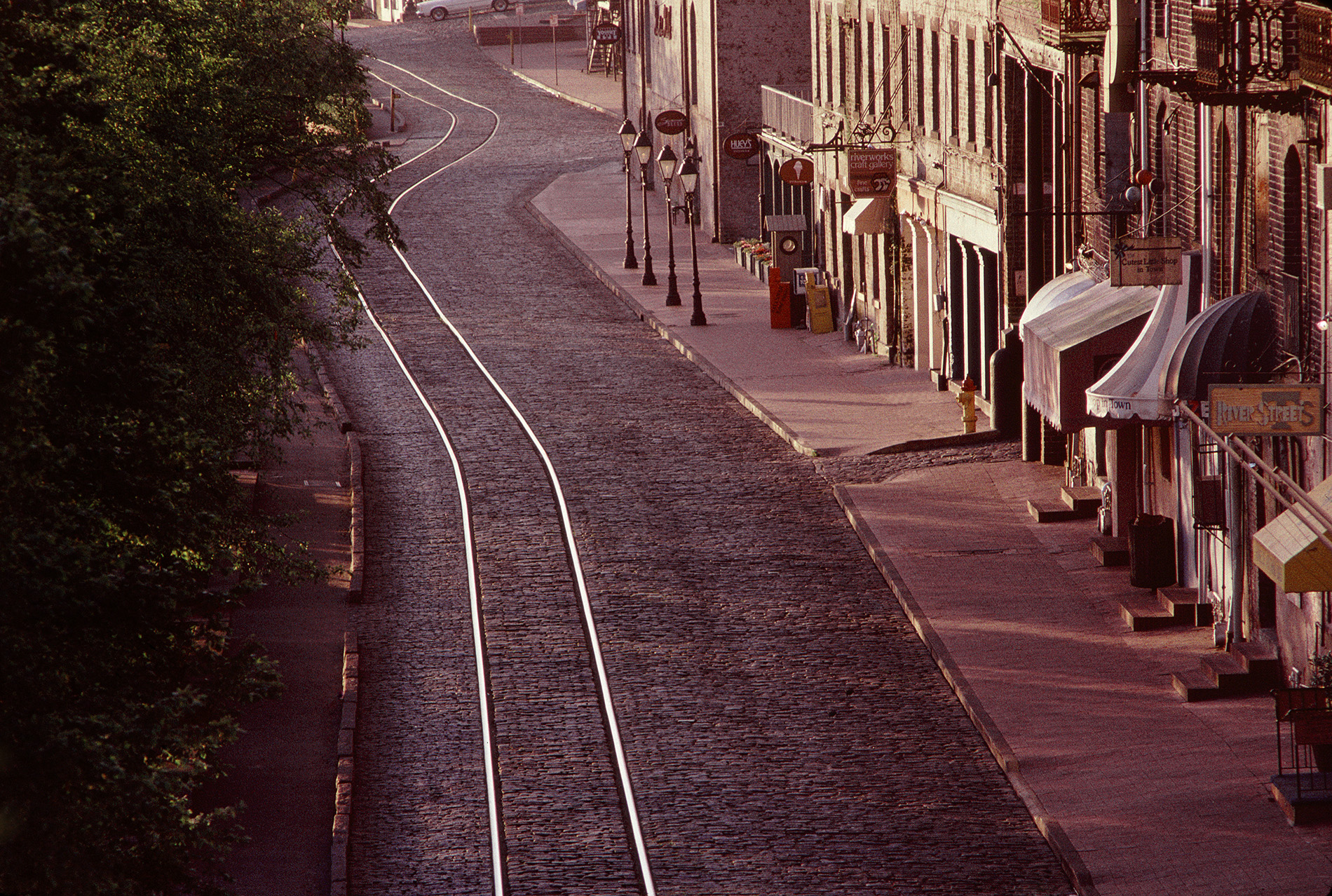
Streetcar tracks

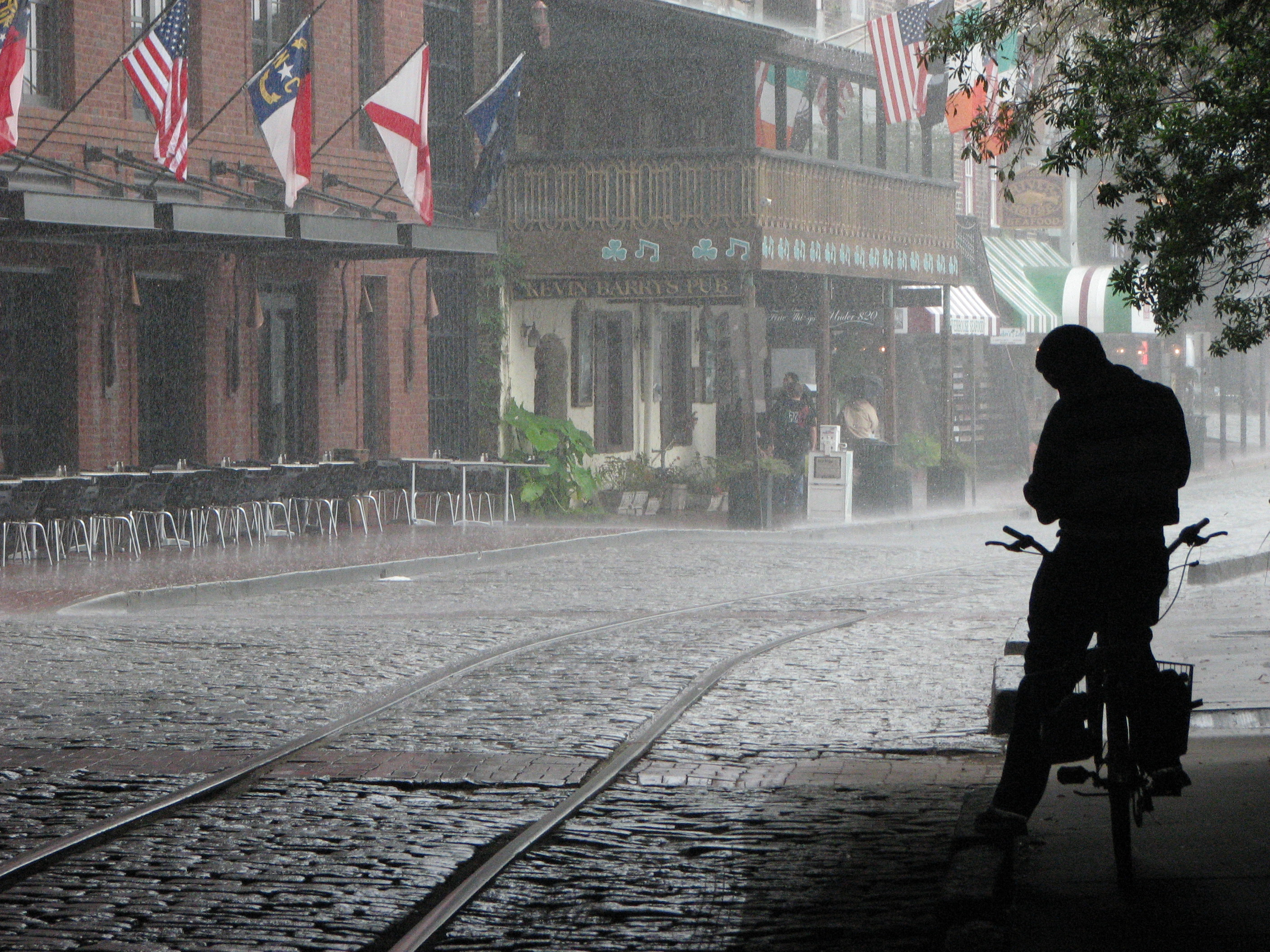
A wet River Street. The in-view Kevin Barry's Pub closed in the new year of 2020 after nearly forty years in business

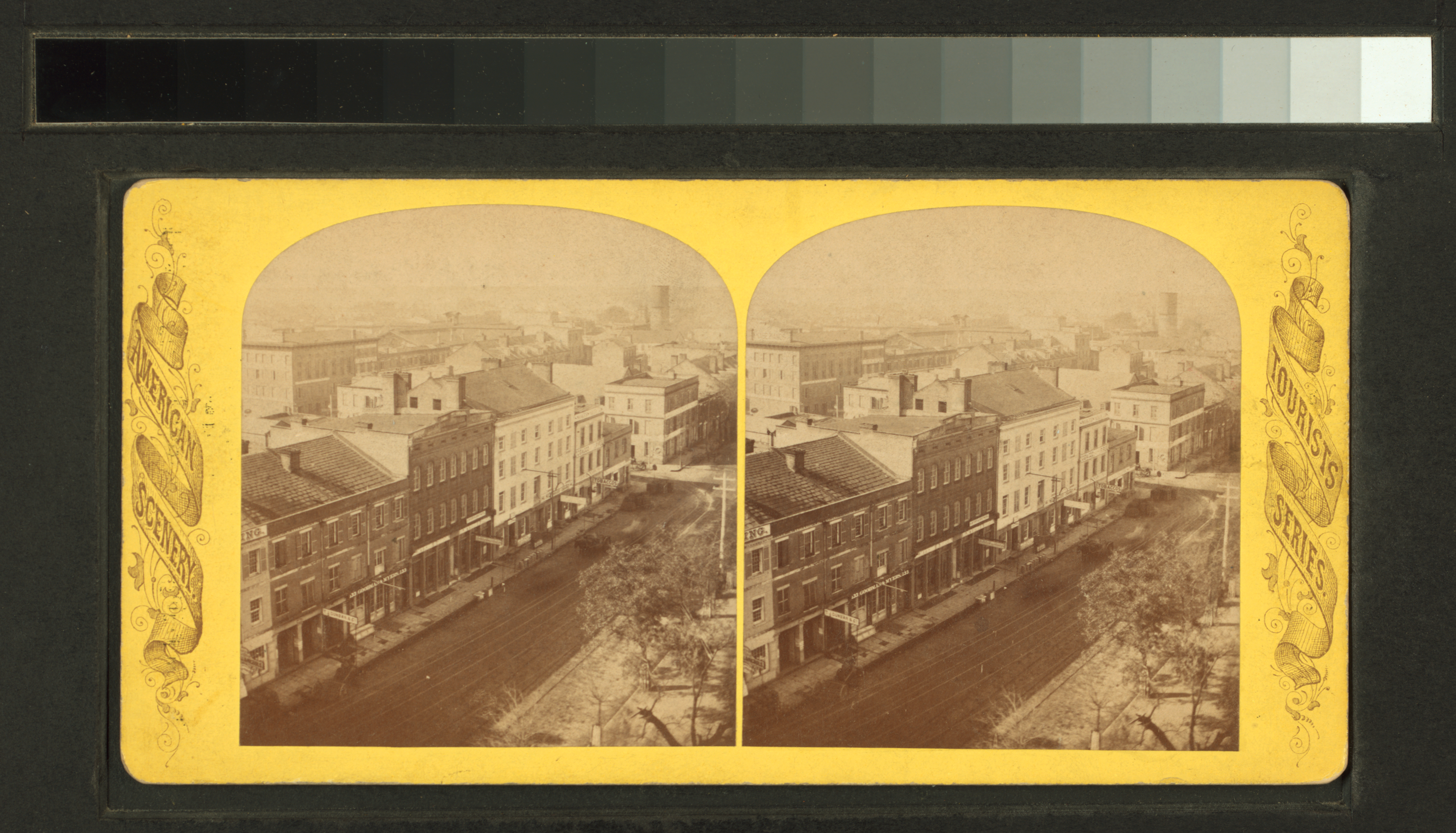
An 1868 panorama

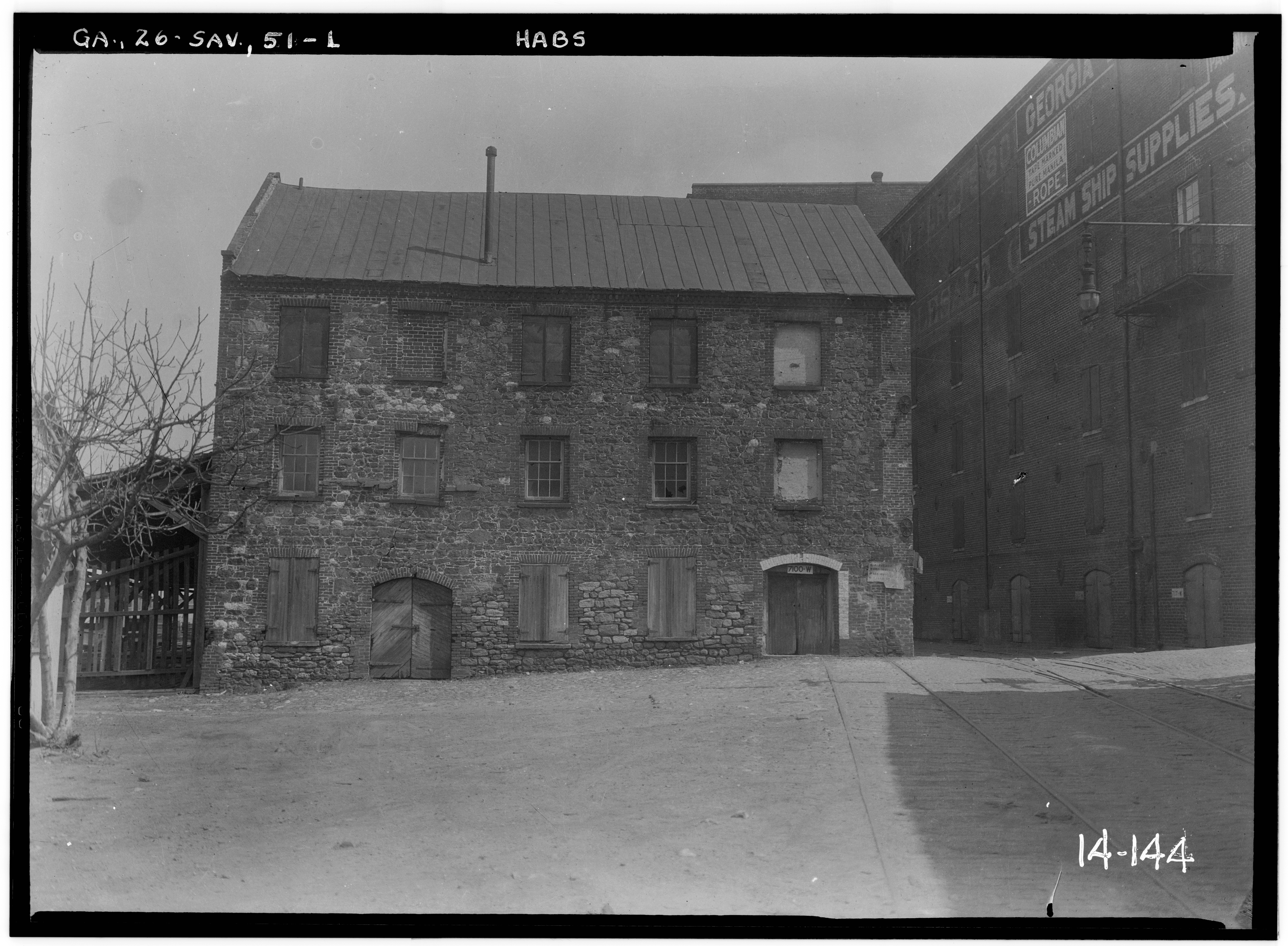
A 1934 view of the now-demolished grinding mill that stood roughly where the World War II memorial just to the northwest of where the Hyatt Regency is today
