= Madison Square (Savannah, Georgia) =

Public square in Savannah, Georgia

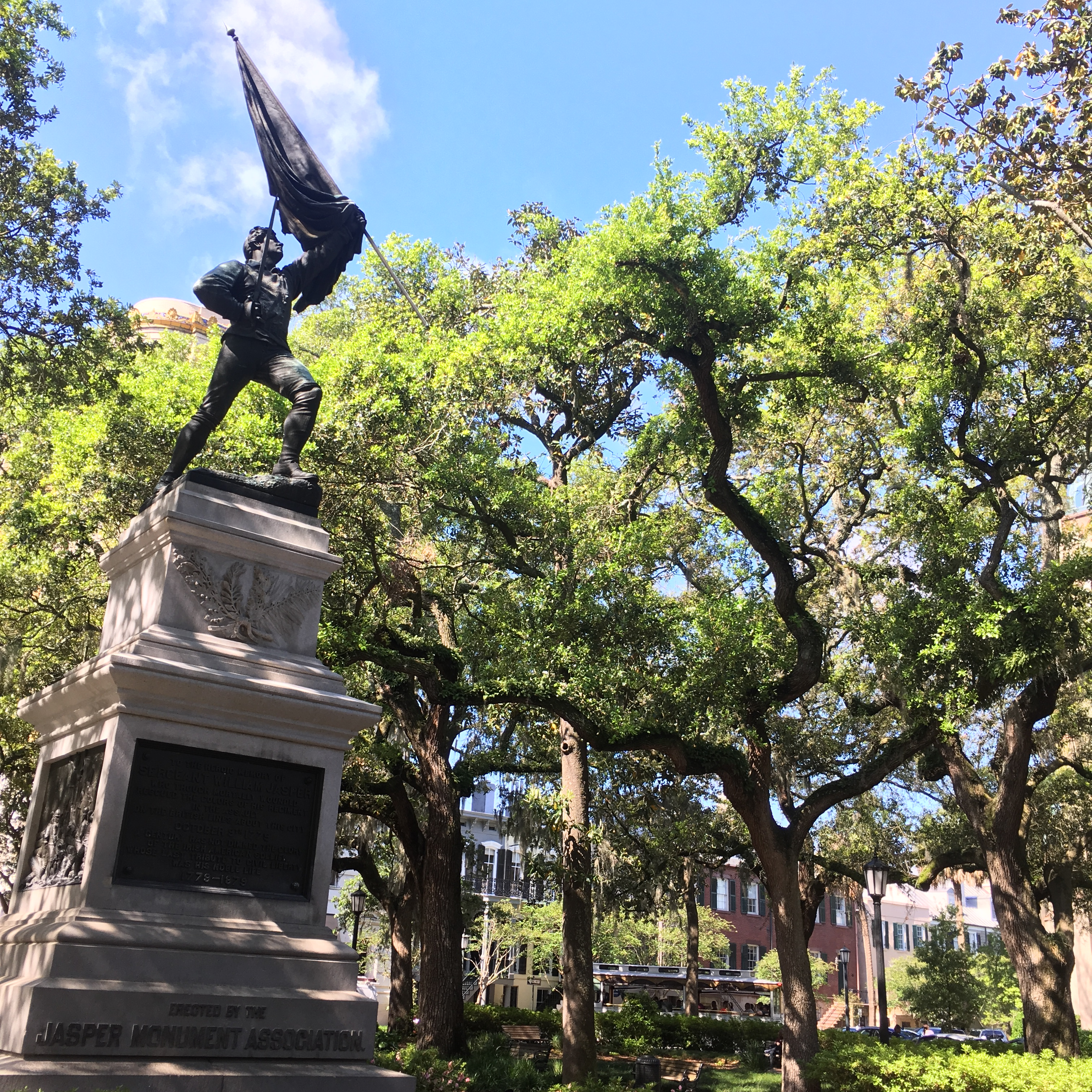
- The William Jasper Monument in the square
- Interactive map of Madison Square
- Namesake: James Madison
- Maintained by: City of Savannah
- Location: Savannah, Georgia, U.S.
- Coordinates: 32.0735°N 81.0939°W
- North: Bull Street
- East: East Macon Street
- South: Bull Street
- West: West Macon Street

Construction
- Completion: 1837 (189 years ago)

Madison Square is one of the 22 squares of Savannah, Georgia, United States. It is located in the fourth row of the city's five rows of squares, on Bull Street and Macon Street, and was laid out in 1837. It is south of Chippewa Square, west of Lafayette Square, north of Monterey Square and east of Pulaski Square. The square is named for James Madison, fourth president of the United States. The oldest building on the square is the Sorrel–Weed House, at 6 West Harris Street, which dates to 1840.

In the center of the square is the William Jasper Monument, an 1888 work by Alexander Doyle memorializing Sergeant William Jasper, a soldier in the siege of Savannah who, though mortally wounded, recovered his company's banner. Savannahians sometimes refer to this as Jasper Square, in honor of Jasper's statue.

Madison Square features a vintage cannon from the Savannah Armory. These now mark the starting points of the first highways in Georgia, the Ogeechee Road, leading to Darien, and the Augusta Road.

The square also includes a monument marking the center of the British resistance during the siege.

The Masonic Hall, at 341 Bull Street, was designed by Hyman Witcover, also the architect of Savannah City Hall.

In 1971 Savannah landscape architect Clermont Huger Lee and Mills B. Lane planned and initiated a project to install new walk patterns with offset sitting areas and connecting walks at curbs, add new benches, lighting and planting.

== Dedication ==
Namesake	Image	Note
James Madison		The square is named for James Madison (1751–1836), fourth president of the United States.

== Markers and structures ==
Object	Image	Note
William Jasper Monument		Madison Square and the William Jasper Monument.
Historical marker		The square's historical marker, erected by the Georgia Historical Commission in 1958.
Historical marker		Ancient and Accepted Scottish Rite of Freemasonry historical marker, erected in 1969.
Historical marker		Cannon.

== Constituent buildings ==
Each building below is in one of the eight blocks around the square composed of four residential "tything" blocks and four civic ("trust") blocks, now known as the Oglethorpe Plan. They are listed with construction years where known.

Northwestern residential/tything lot

- Sorrel–Weed House, 6 West Harris Street (1840) – oldest building on the square
- Francis Sorrel Property, 12 West Harris Street (1856)
- Eugenia & Louisa Kerr Duplex, 14–18 West Harris Street (1842–1843) – attributed to Charles B. Cluskey
- Eliza Ann Jewett Property (3), 20–22 West Harris Street (1842–1843)
- 24 West Harris Street (1840)
- John Gallie Property, 26 West Harris Street (1840) – now Harris Hall, property of SCAD

Northwestern civic/trust lot

- Green–Meldrim House, 14 West Macon Street (1850–1853)

Southwestern civic/trust lot

- St. John's Episcopal Church, 325 Bull Street (1853)

Southwestern residential/tything lot

- Masonic Hall, 341 Bull Street (1912/1923) – now Gryphon, part of SCAD
- Daniel Purse Row House, 5–9 West Charlton Street (1879)
- Daniel Robertson Property (1), 11–17 West Charlton Street (1852–1853)
- Daniel Robertson Property (2), 19 West Charlton Street (1857)
- Daniel Robertson Property (3), 23–25 West Charlton Street (1845)

Northeastern residential/tything lot

- The DeSoto, 15 East Liberty Street (1968) – replaced the original, 1890-built Hotel DeSoto, designed by William G. Preston

Northeastern civic/trust lot

- Eliza Ann Jewett Property (1), 326 Bull Street (1843)
- Eliza Ann Jewett Row House, 18–24 East Macon Street (1852–1853)

Southeastern residential/tything lot

- Poetter Hall, 342 Bull Street (1893)
- Louisa Porter Home, 23 East Charlton Street, Savannah, Georgia (1853)

== Gallery ==
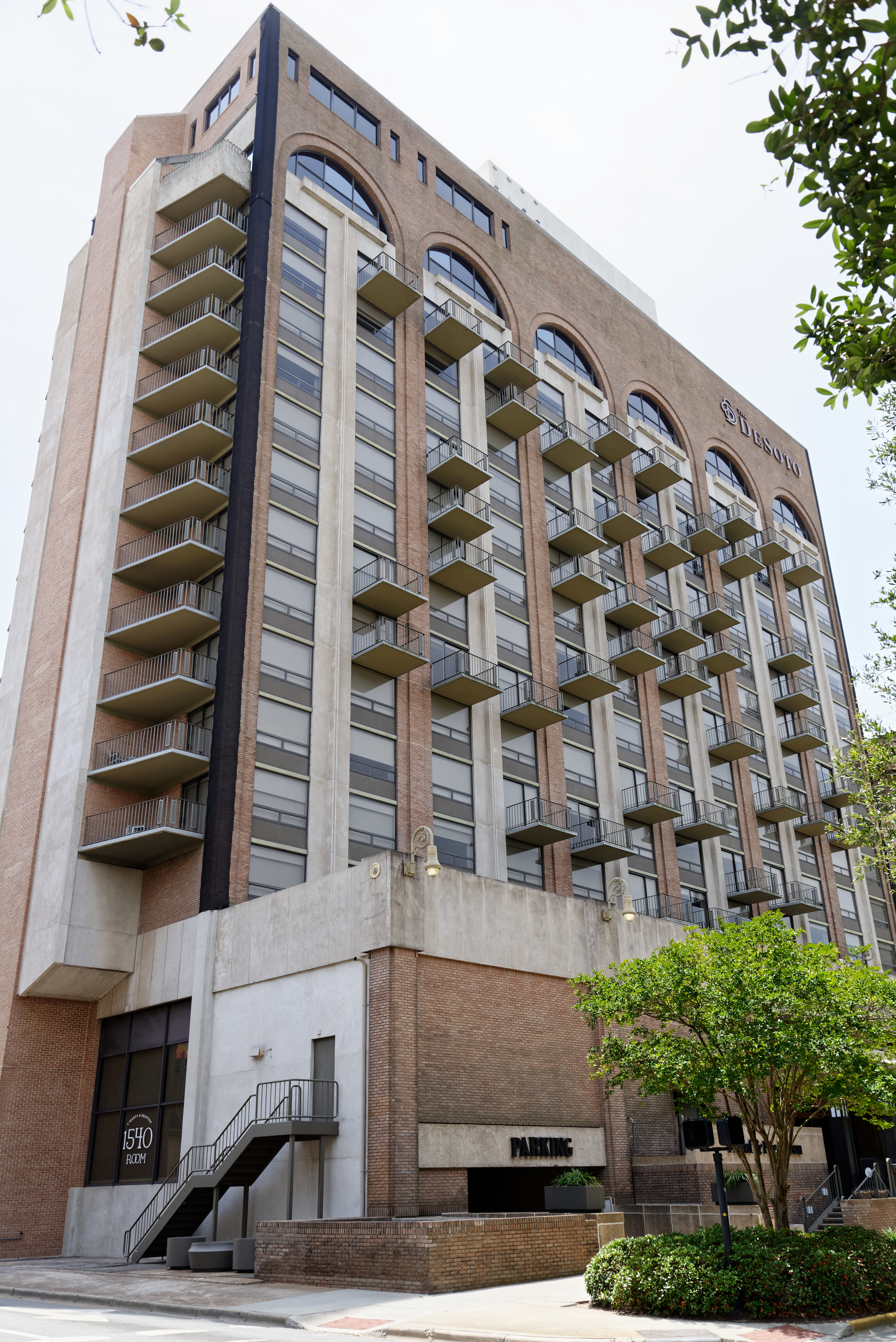
The DeSoto Hotel, 15 East Liberty Street

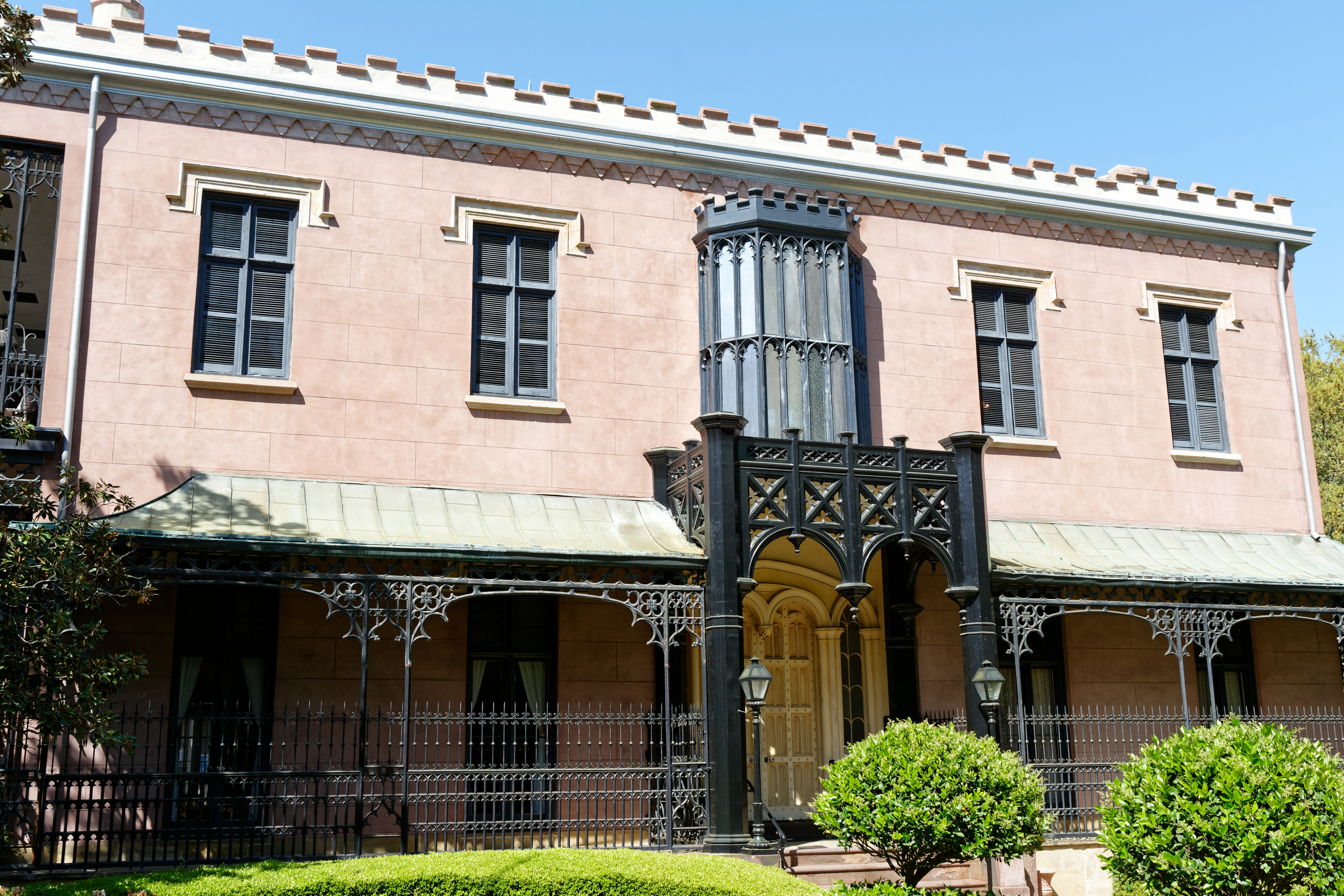
Green–Meldrim House, 14 West Macon Street

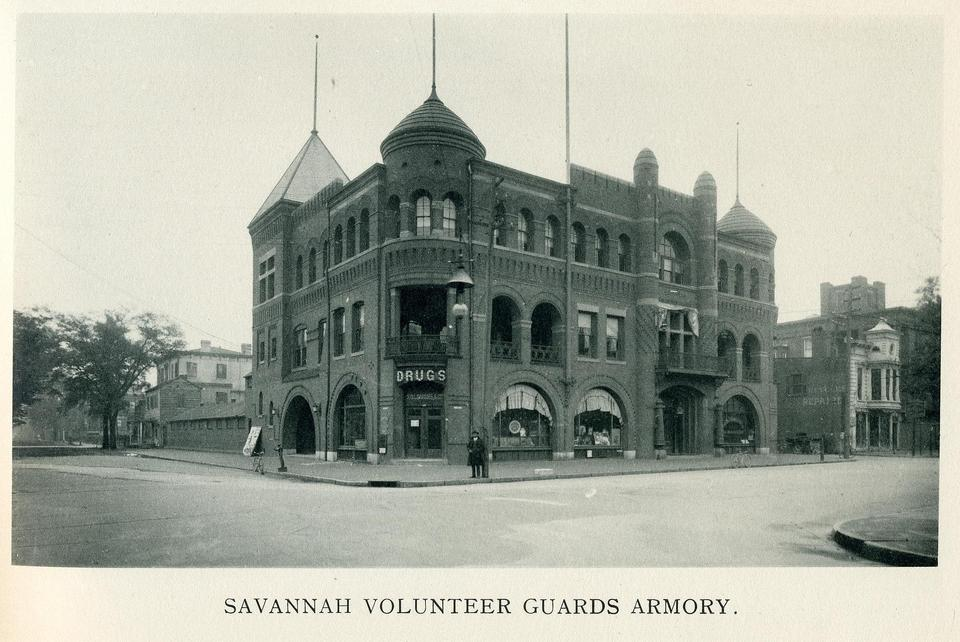
Poetter Hall, 342 Bull Street

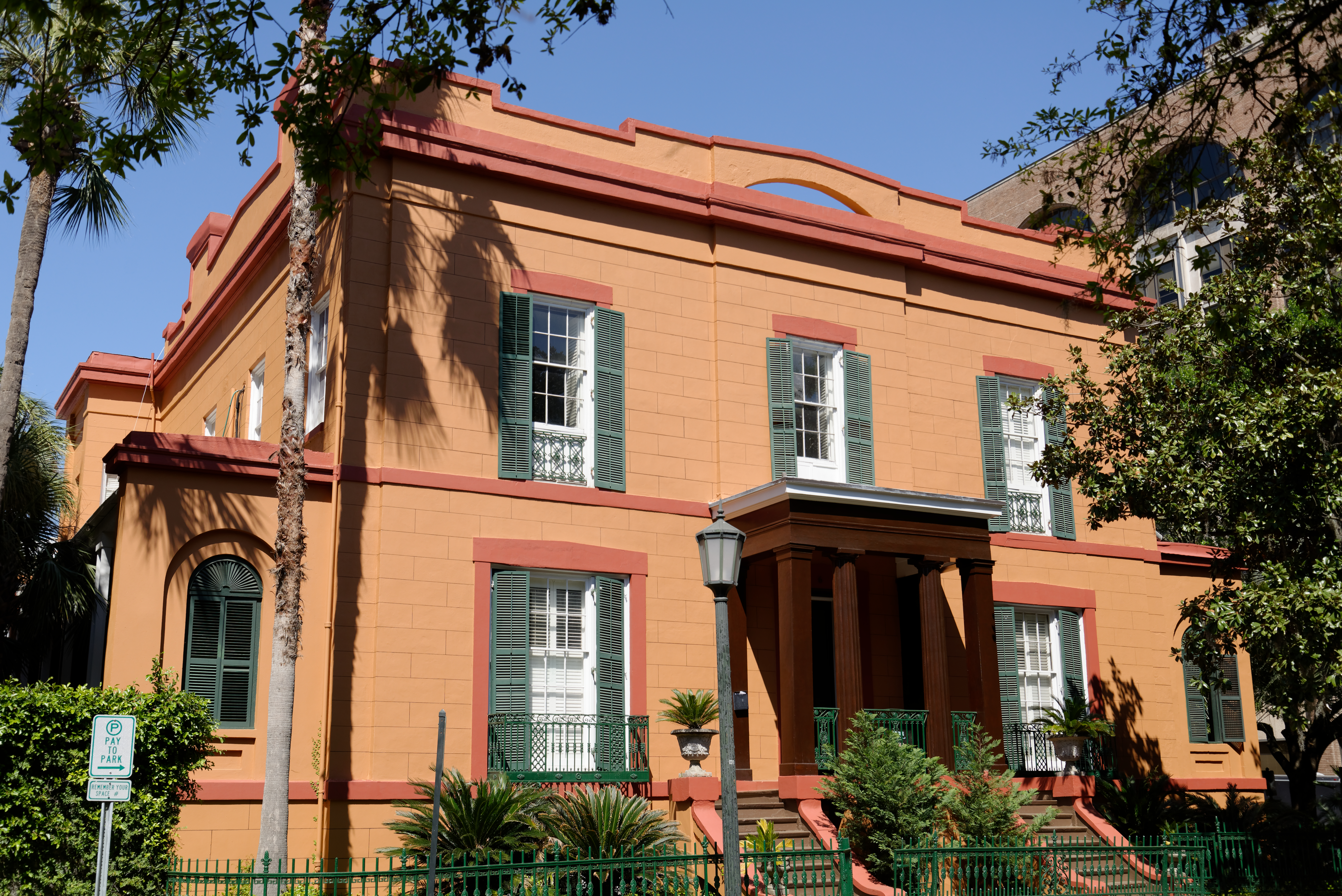
Sorrel–Weed House, 6 West Harris Street

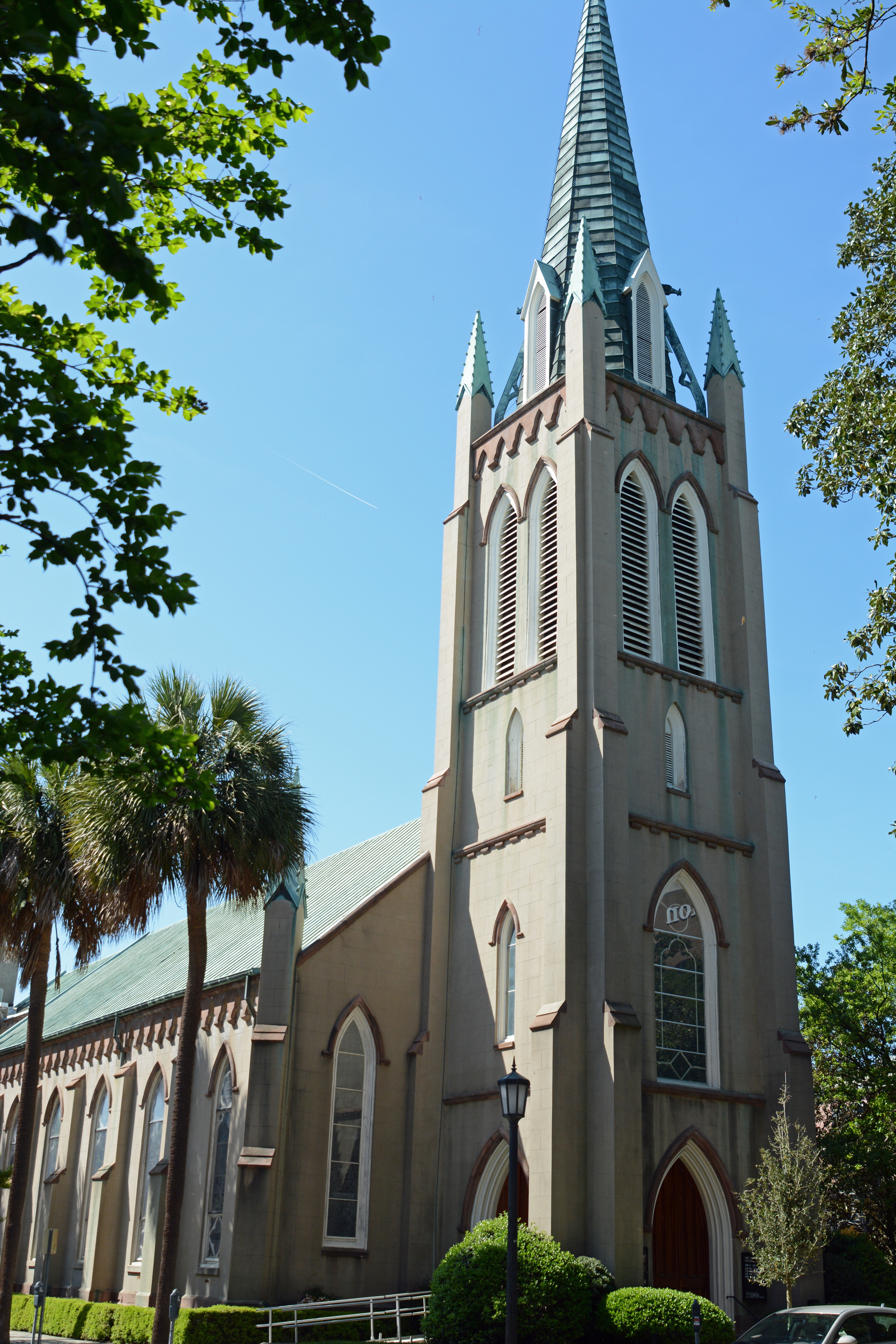
St. John's Episcopal Church, 325 Bull Street

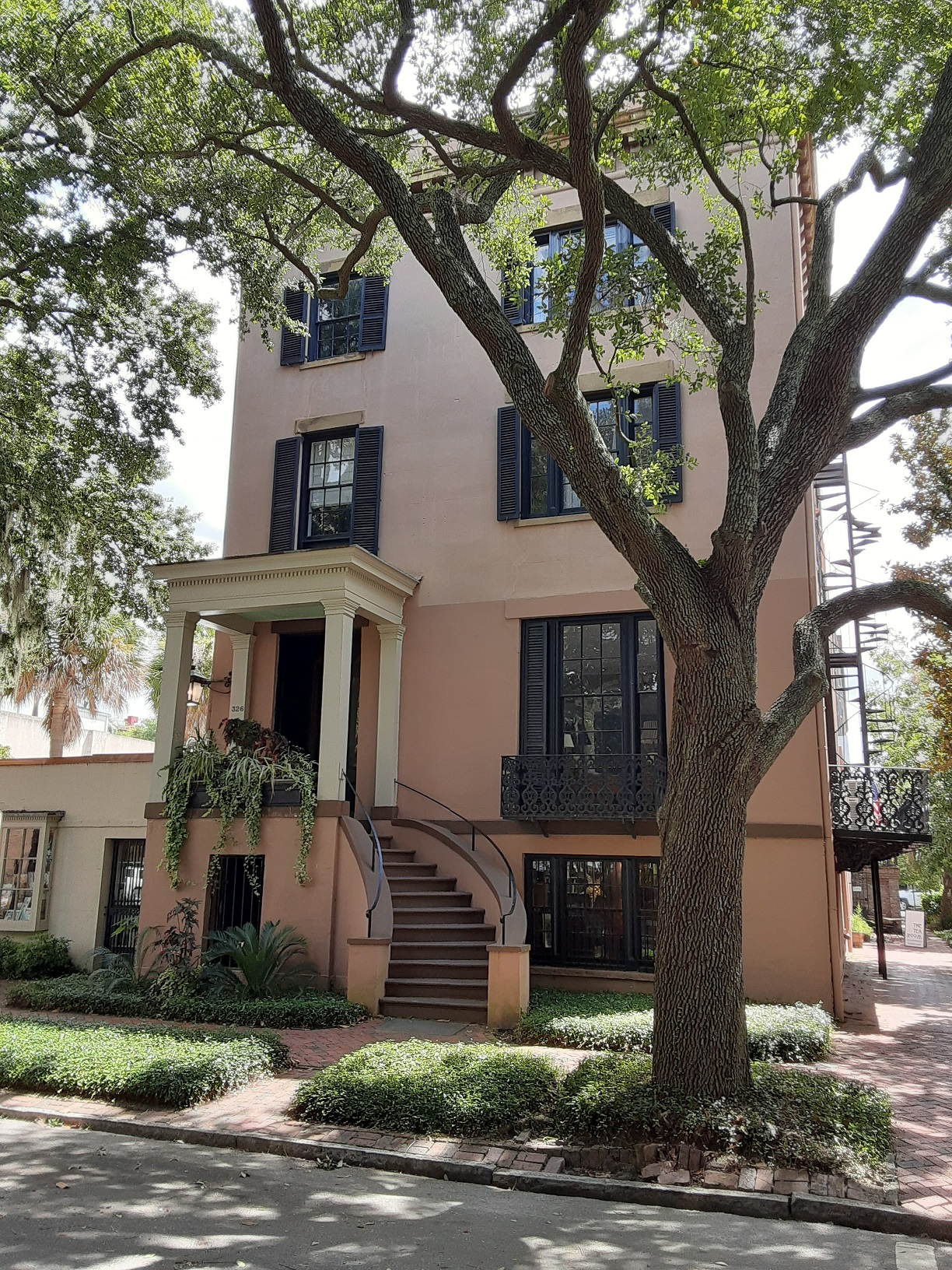
Eliza Ann Jewett House, 326 Bull Street

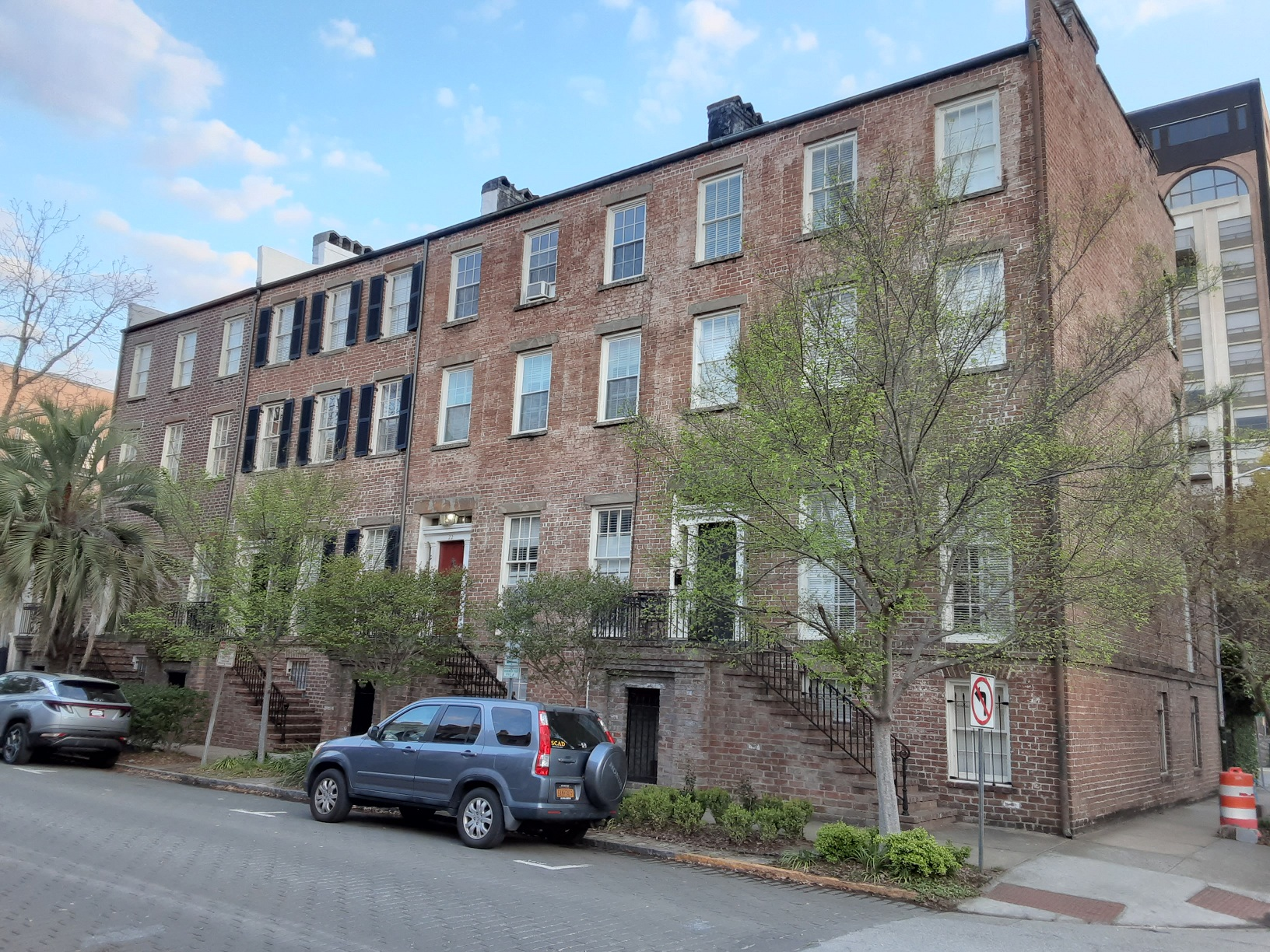
Eliza Ann Jewett Row House, 18–24 East Macon Street

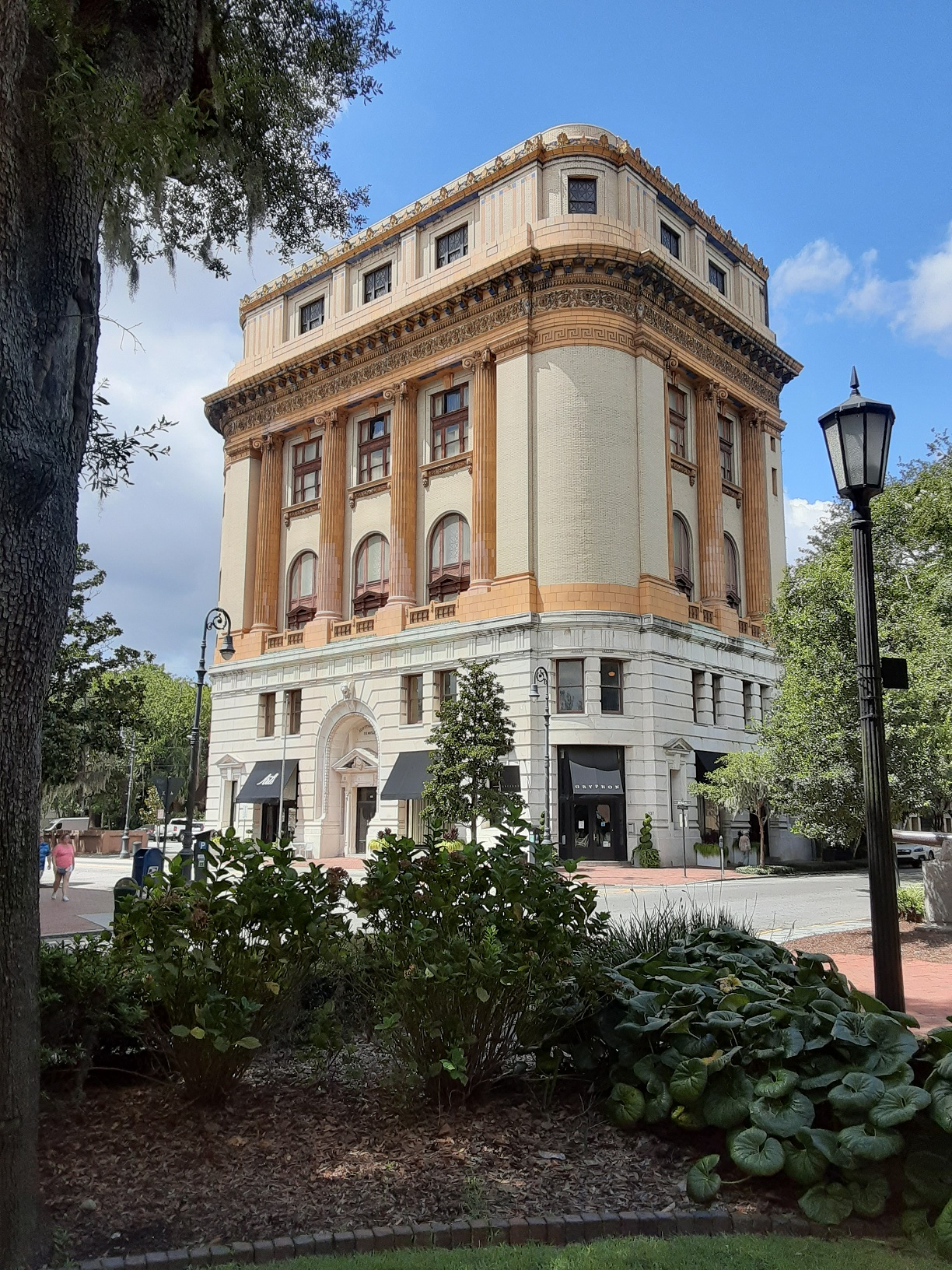
Masonic Temple, 341 Bull Street

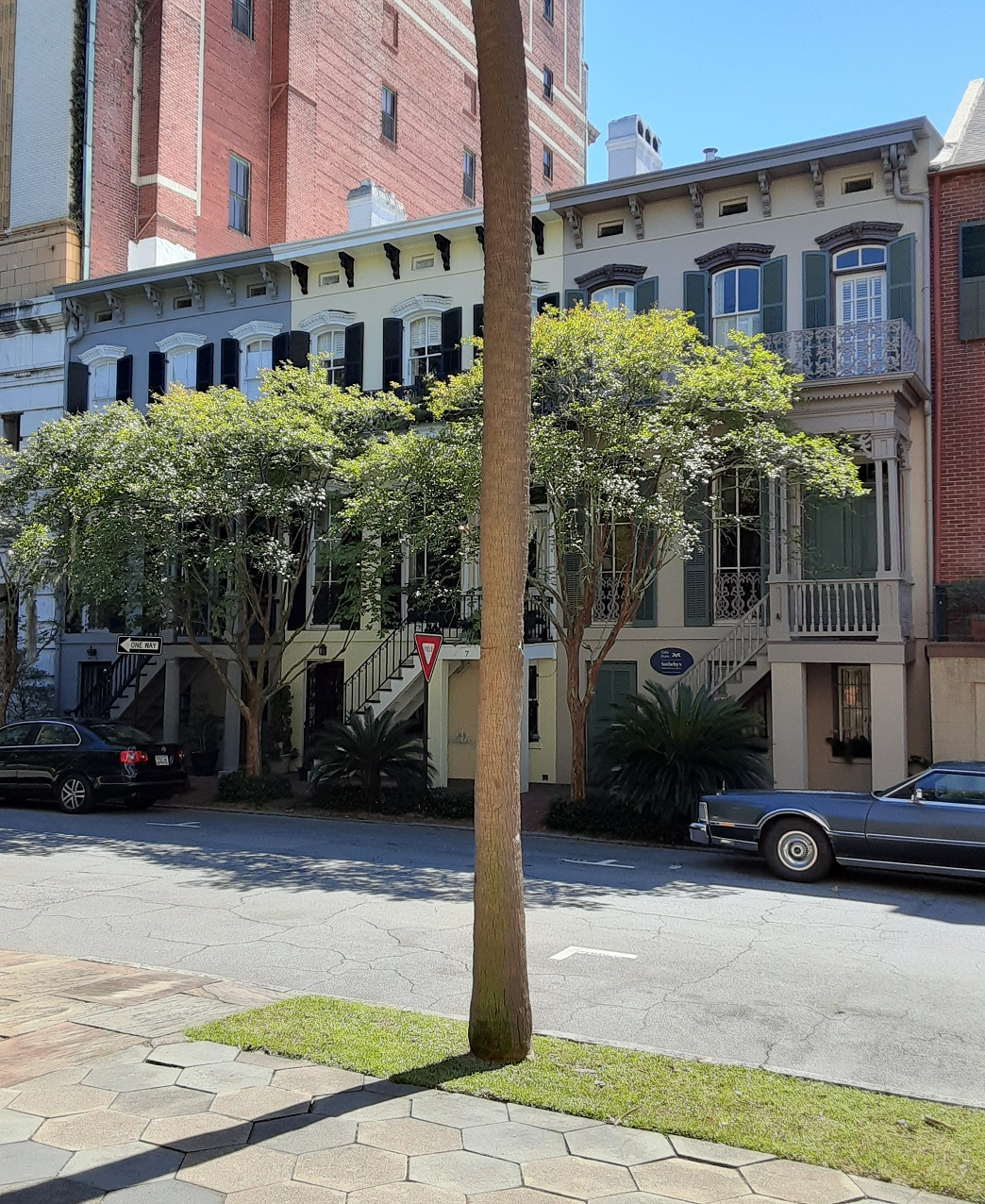
Daniel Purse Row House, 5–9 West Charlton Street

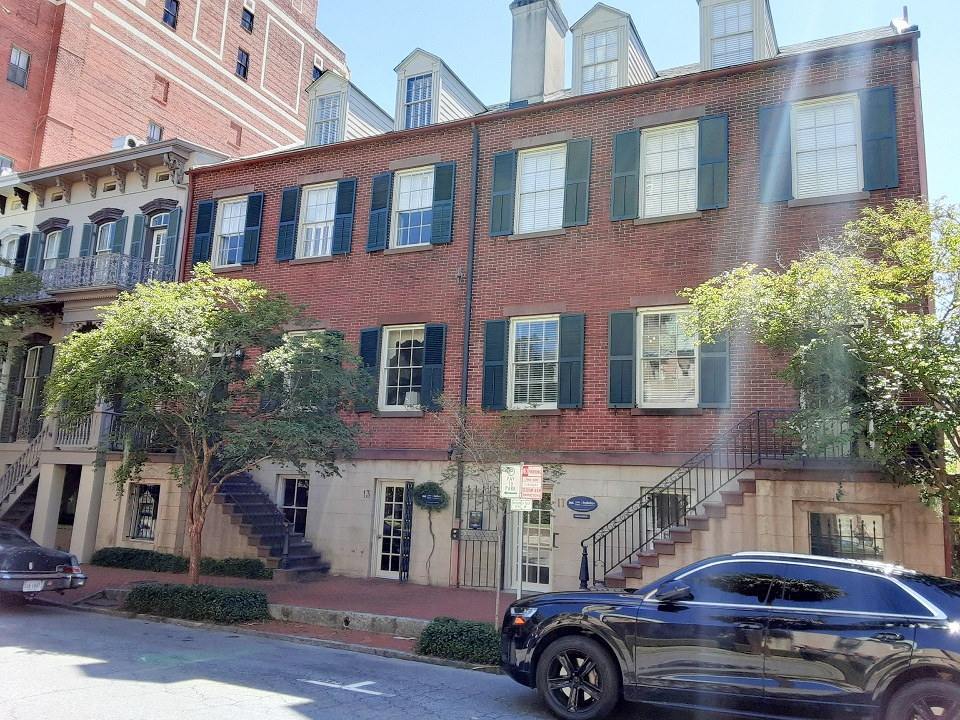
Daniel Robertson Property (1), 11–17 West Charlton Street

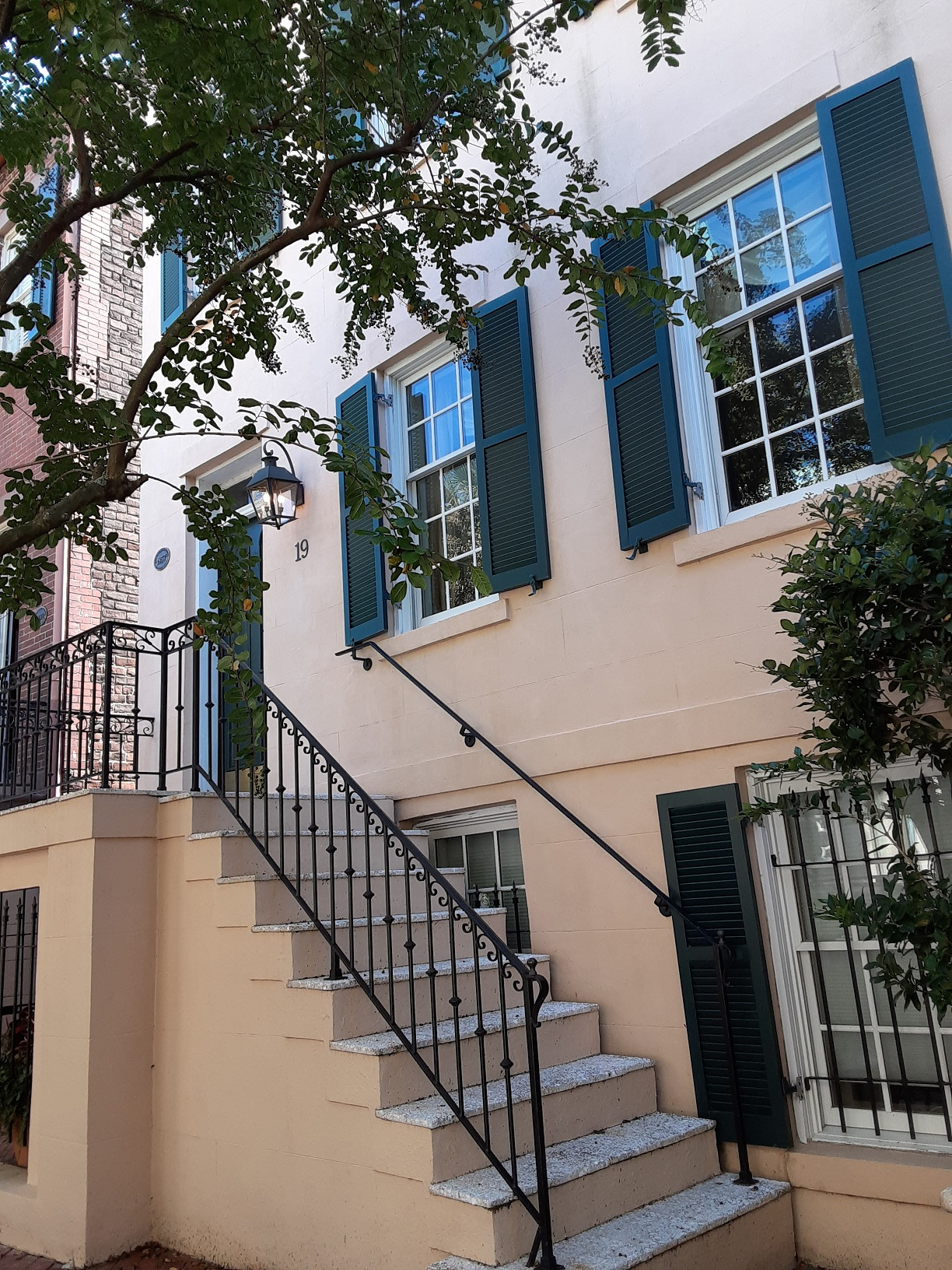
Daniel Robertson Property (2), 19 West Charlton Street

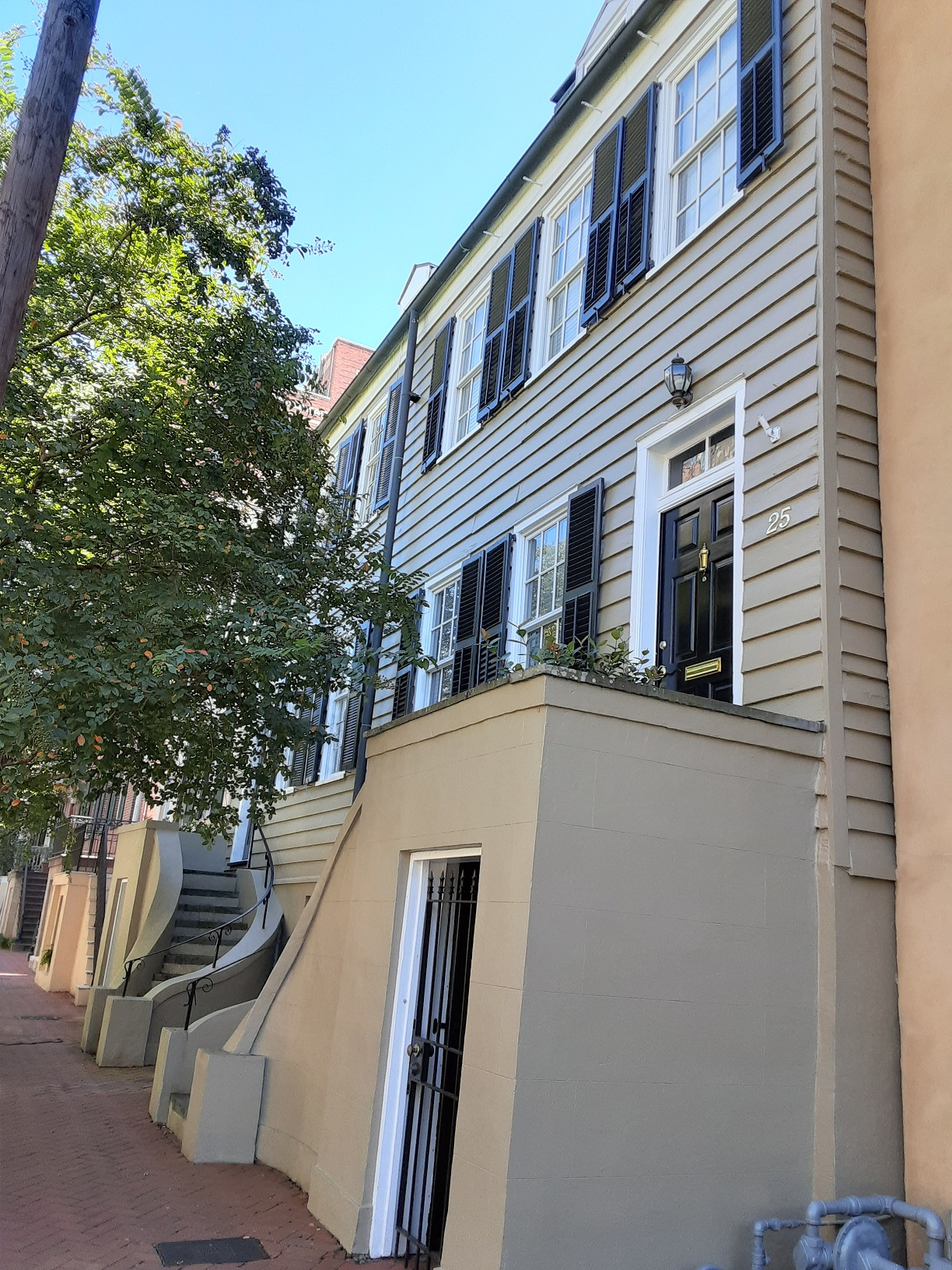
Daniel Robertson Property (3), 23–25 West Charlton Street

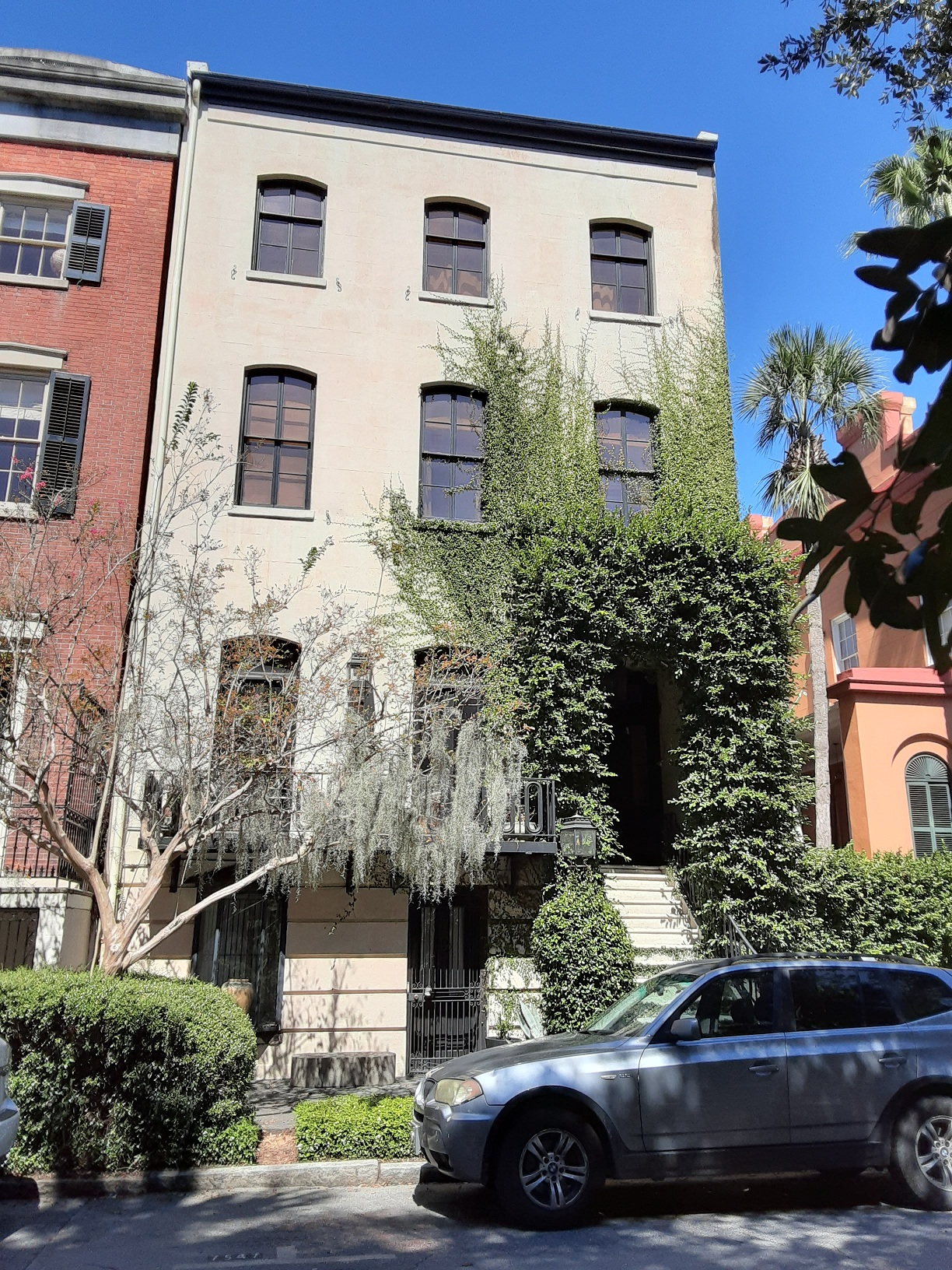
Francis Sorrel Property, 12 West Harris Street

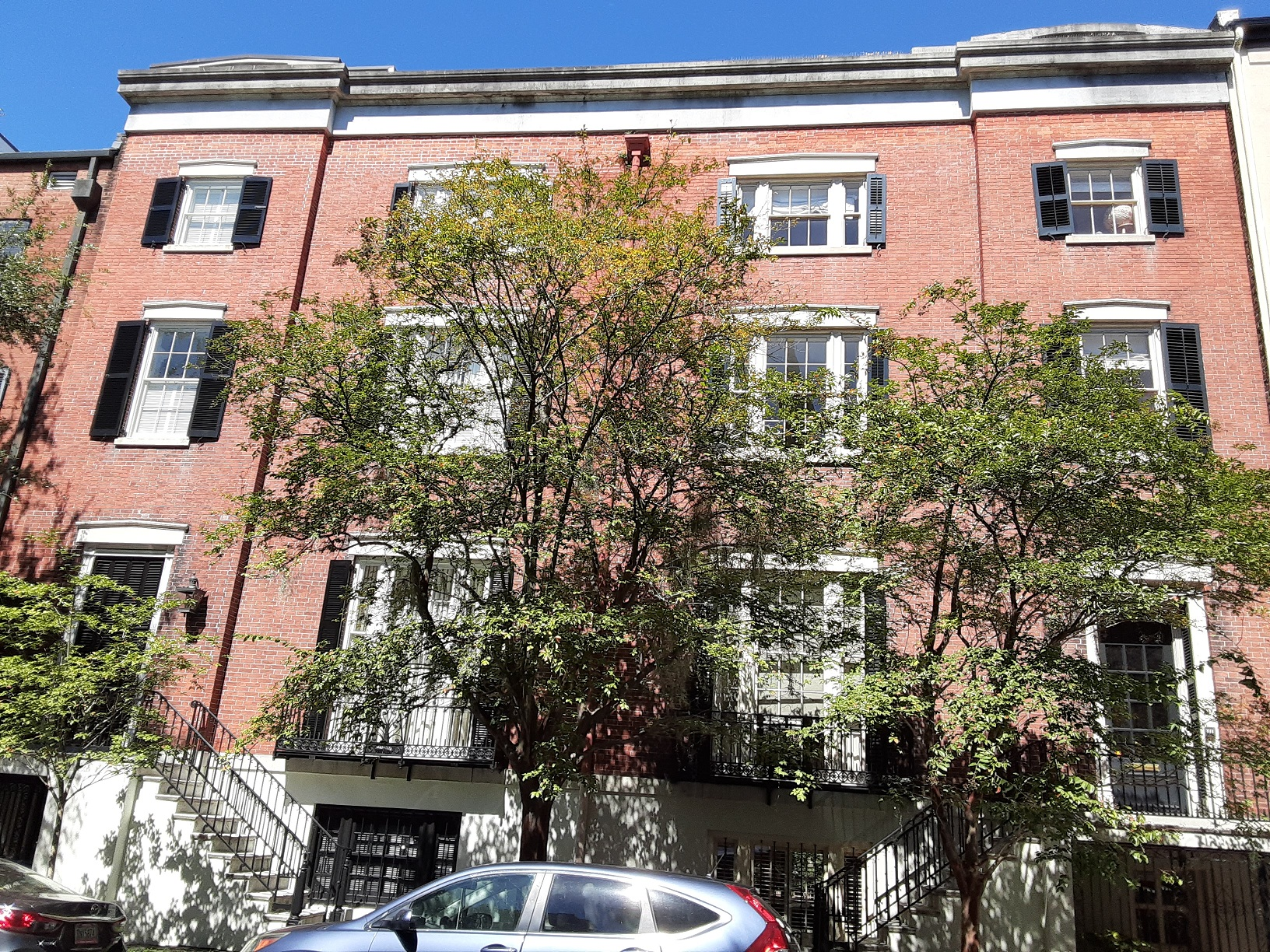
Eugenia & Louisa Kerr Duplex, 14–18 West Harris Street

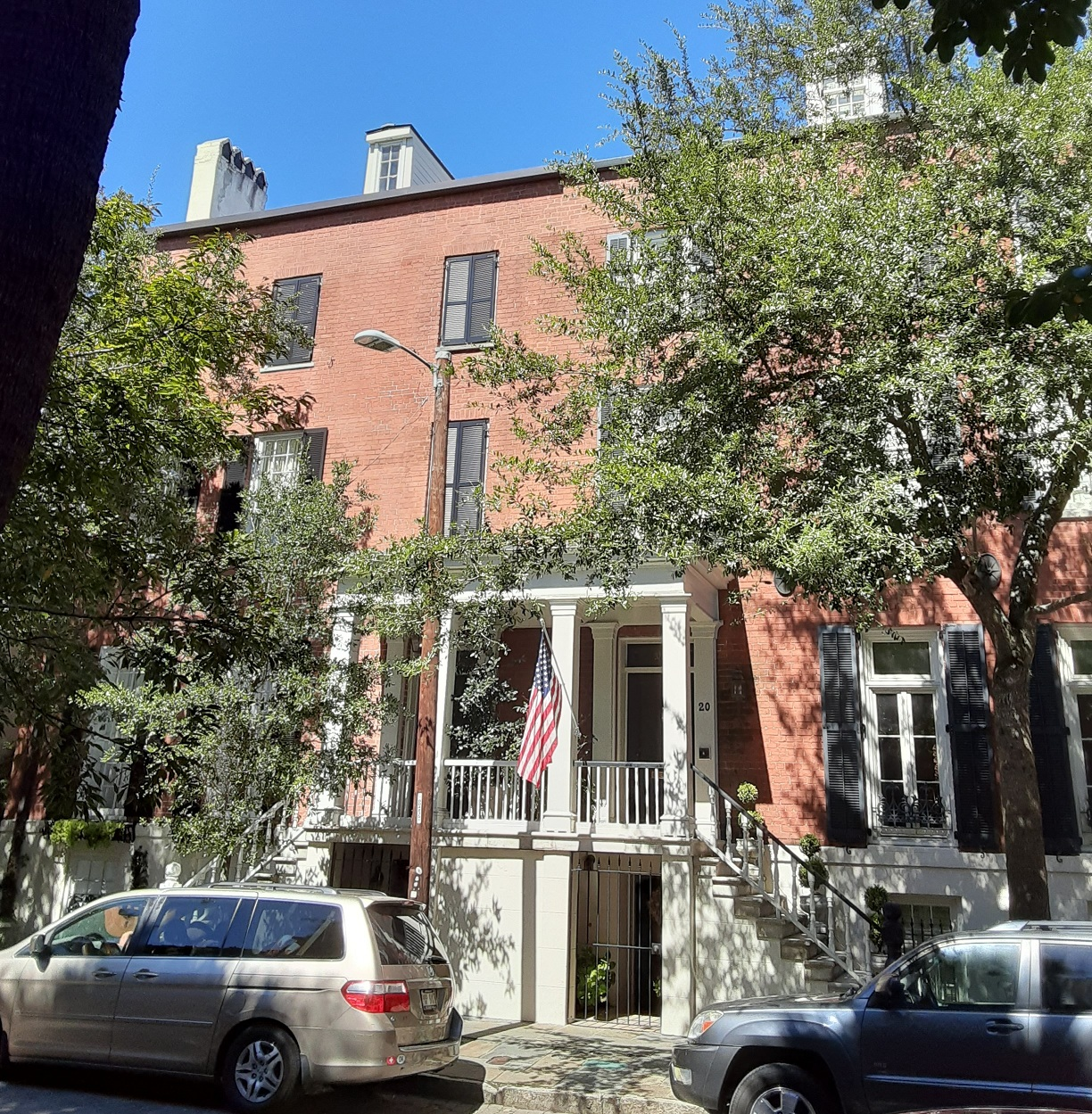
Eliza Ann Jewett Property (3), 20–22 West Harris Street

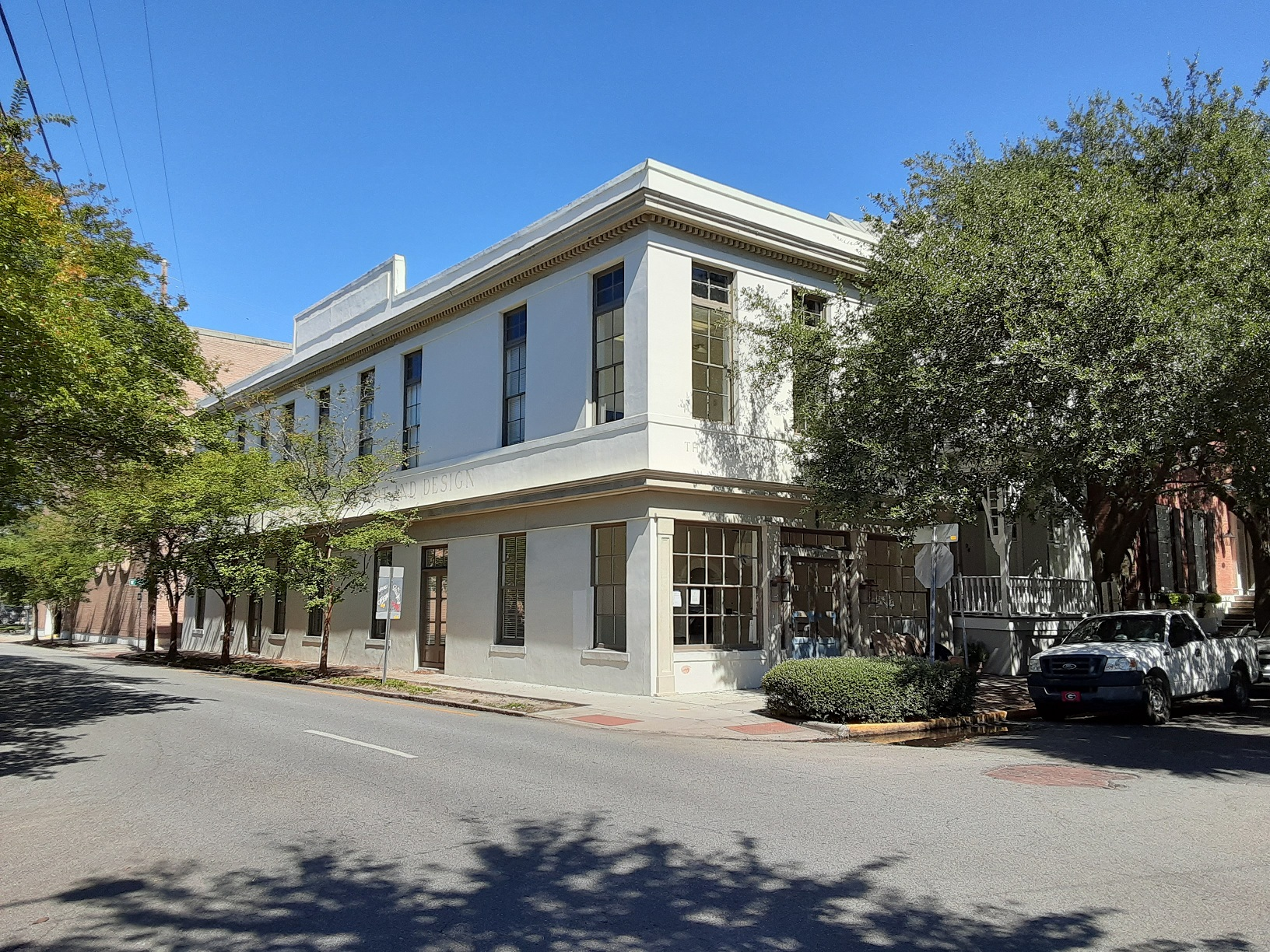
John Gallie Property, 26 West Harris Street
