= Masonic Center (Savannah) =

Savannah Masonic Center
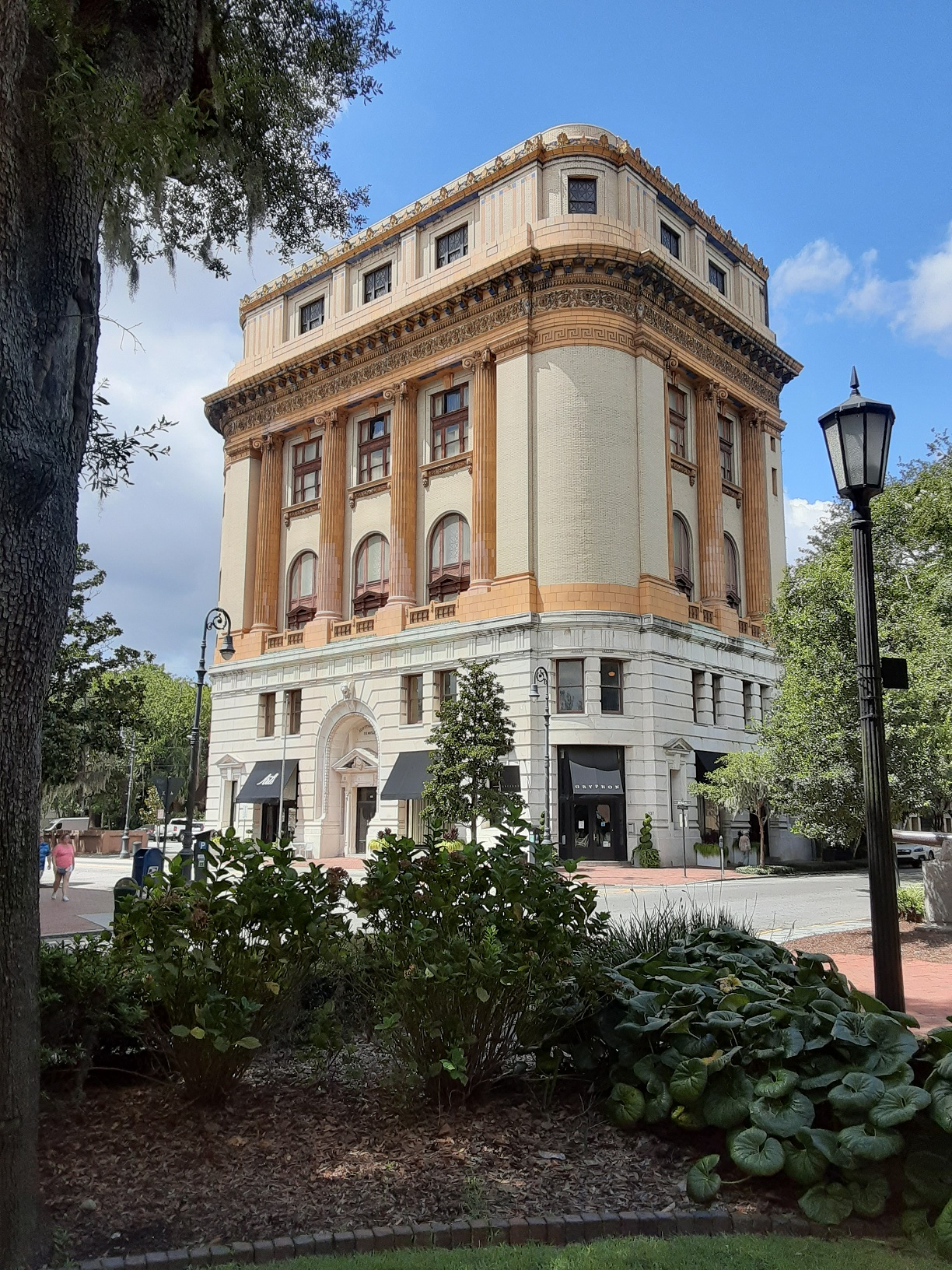
- The building in 2021, viewed from within Madison Square, looking southwest
- Interactive map of the Savannah Masonic Center area

General information
- Location: 341 Bull Street, Madison Square, Savannah, Georgia
- Coordinates: 32.073115°N 81.094337°W
- Current tenants: Gryphon Tea Room
- Construction started: June 30, 1913
- Completed: 1923 (103 years ago)
- Owner: Savannah College of Art and Design (since 1981)

Technical details
- Floor count: 5

Design and construction
- Architect: Hyman Witcover

Savannah Masonic Center is a historic building at 341 Bull Street in downtown Savannah, Georgia, United States. Situated in the southwestern corner of Madison Square, it was constructed between 1913 and 1923, to a design by Hyman Witcover, previously the architect of Savannah City Hall. Today it is known as Gryphon, and is part of the Savannah College of Art and Design (SCAD).

The land on which the building stands was purchased in November 1895. Eight years later, a general appeal was made to the Masonic community for additional support in financing the construction of a Masonic hall. The cornerstone was laid on June 30, 1913, by Robert L. Colding, Grand Master of Masons in Georgia. The building's construction was completed a decade later and deeded to the Scottish Rite.

In July 2019, the building was sold to SCAD, which had previously leased part of it, and the Scottish Rite Masonic Center was moved to a new location on Chatham Center Drive.
