= City Exchange (Savannah, Georgia) =

Former building in Savannah, Georgia, U.S.

- The building in 1799 (not 1797, as stated on its caption), shortly after its construction

- Location within Georgia Location within the United States

General information
- Location: Bay Street at Bull Street; Savannah, Georgia, U.S.
- Coordinates: 32.08111°N 81.09112°W
- Opened: 1799
- Demolished: 1904 (122 years ago)

Technical details
- Floor count: 3 (facing Bay Street); 5 (facing River Street)

Design and construction
- Architect: Adrian Boucher

City Exchange was a building that stood on Bay Street in Savannah, Georgia, United States, between 1799 and 1904. It replaced a previous structure destroyed by fire in 1796. The former seat of Savannah's municipal government, the Exchange was demolished and replaced by Savannah City Hall in 1904.

The Exchange building, which fronted around 75 feet (23 m) along Bay Street and ran back around 50 feet (15 m) toward the Savannah River, was the design of French architect and builder Adrian Boucher, who arrived from New York City in 1797, the year following the great fire of Savannah, to assist with the reconstruction of the city's important buildings.

The Exchange served both public and private interests until 1812, when the city purchased it for use as its city hall, moving from the Filature building, which was destroyed by fire in 1840. On the first floor, running the entire width of the building, was the "long room", at the eastern end of which was the mayor's office. The rest of the room was used as council chambers. The clerk of the council's office was located in the northeastern corner of this floor, adjoining the mayor's chamber. The city treasurer's office was in the northwestern corner. On the second floor was the city marshal's office, among other offices.

The Exchange building was renovated in 1854, including the addition of a portico. The architect was Savannah's Sholl & Fay.

In December 1864, Union Army general John W. Geary gave a speech in front of the building in which he congratulated his troops, who had captured "this most beautiful city of the South" during the Civil War.

In September 1896, the building was one of several that was damaged in a severe storm that passed through Savannah.

== Bell ==
The building's bell, one of the oldest in Georgia, was constructed in 1802 and imported from Amsterdam. It hung in the bell tower of the Exchange from 1804 until the building's demolition. After being in the possession of Rourke Iron Works until 1940, it is now located in a replica of the tower, which was erected in 1957, in another location on East Bay Street. When it was in situ, the bell signalled the closing time for businesses. It was also rung by a watchman when fire broke out. It rang out in celebration of American victories during the War of 1812.

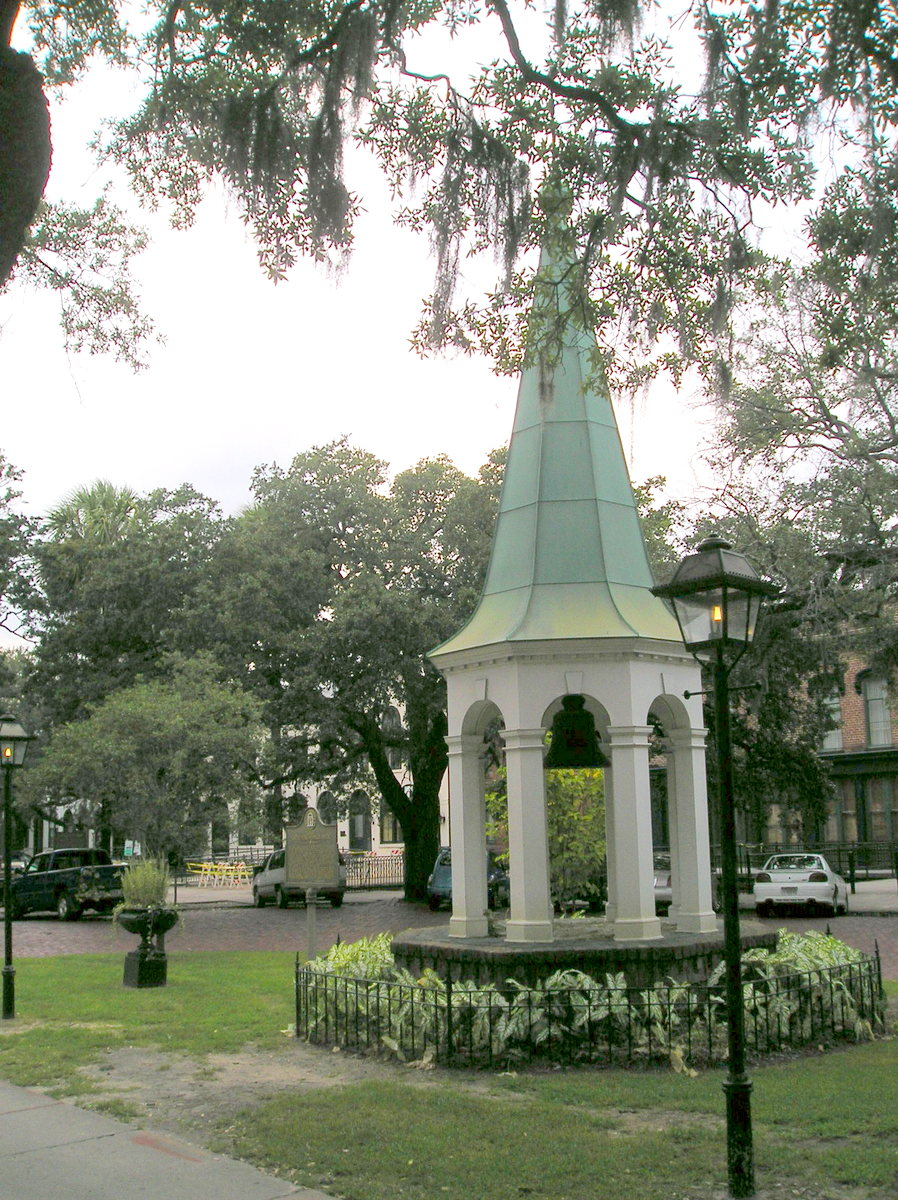
The Exchange's bell on display on East Bay Street in a copy of the building's cupola
