= James F. Post =

American architect

- Born: James Francis Post; September 24, 1818; Fairfield Township, Essex County, New Jersey, US
- Died: July 15, 1899 (aged 80); Wilmington, North Carolina, US
- Occupation: Architect
- Spouse: Mary Ann Russell Post
- Children: 3

James F. Post (September 24, 1818 – July 15, 1899) was an American architect, builder, and contractor who designed and oversaw the construction of over 60 buildings. He is most known for his buildings in Wilmington, North Carolina, including the Bellamy Mansion, New Hanover County Courthouse, City Hall-Thalian Hall, and Zebulon Latimer House.

== Early life ==
James F. Post was born James Francis Post in Fairfield Township, Essex County, New Jersey, on September 24, 1818.

At some point around 1836, he moved to New York and studied architecture there for five years. In 1841 he moved to Petersburg, Virginia, and worked as an architect and builder for eight years. During his time in Petersburg, he met his future wife Mary Ann Russel; they were married October 8, 1843. During their time in Virginia, the couple had two children: Erastus, who died shortly after, and Thomas Russell Post (1846-1943).

In 1849, the family moved to Wilmington, North Carolina, where they had a third child, James France Post, Jr. (1850-1918). Post began his career in Wilmington by doing small carpentry jobs, but he soon took on larger jobs and developed a reputation as an architect. He took quickly to his newly adopted home and would later fight for North Carolina on the side of the Confederacy during the American Civil War.

== Architecture career ==
Little is known about Post's architectural career before his move to Wilmington, however it is alleged he designed the first residence for millionaire John Jacob Astor in New York City 1840. Post moved to Wilmington, North Carolina in 1849 and resided there until his death in 1899.

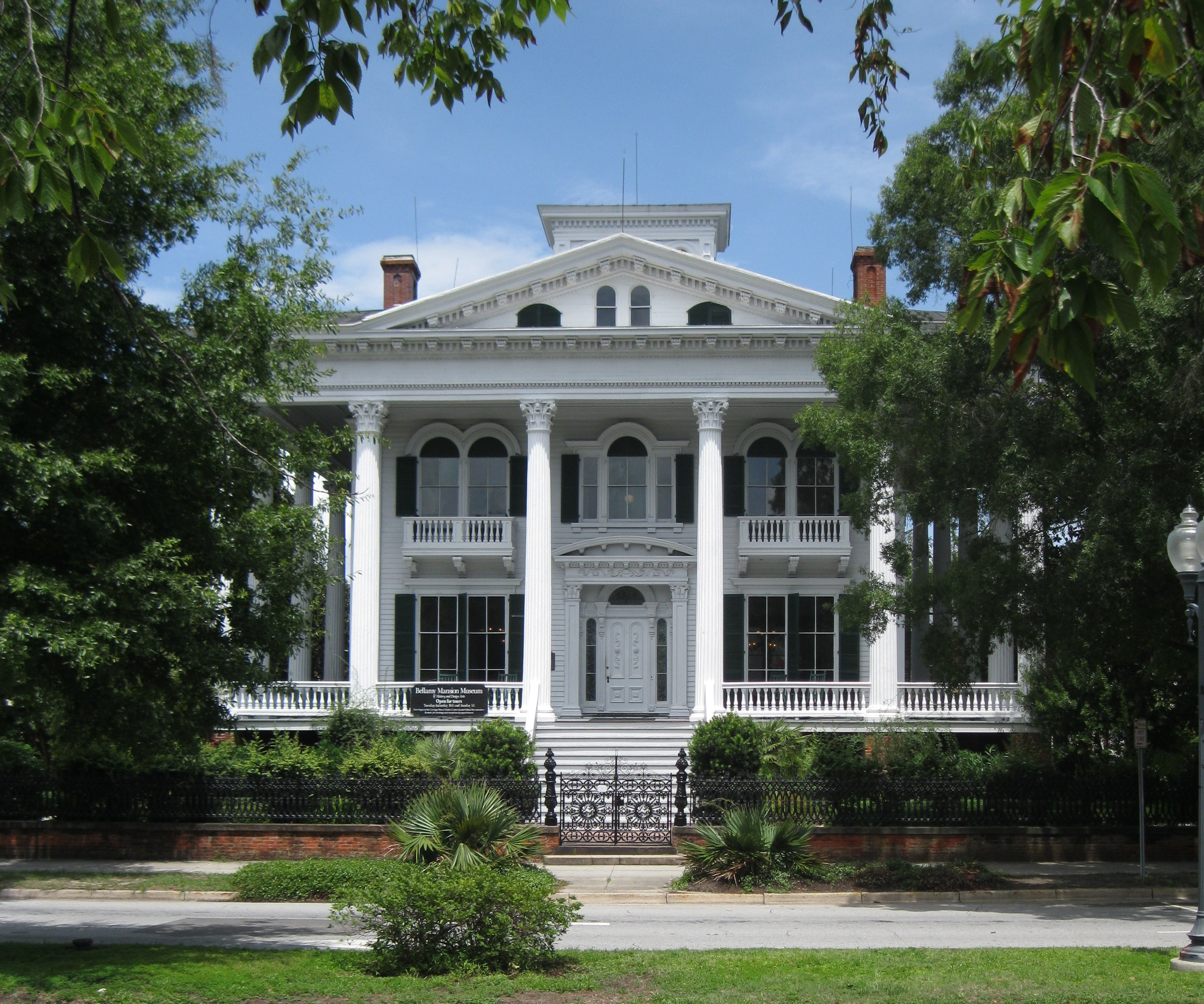
The Bellamy Mansion, designed by James F. Post, now stands as a museum.

Throughout his career, Post would identify with different careers in construction depending on the current demands of the community. In the 1850s he identified himself as a carpenter, while saying he was an architect by the 1860s. From the 1860s on, he would alternatively call himself any combination of the titles of architect, contractor, carpenter, and builder, often all four titles in succession. he would often engage in contractor work as a carpentry partner or as a supervising architect for local mason contractors like Joseph Keen or Robert B. and John C. Wood, usually when they undertook large projects.

In 1859 after finishing the City Hall-Thalian Hall project, Post undertook a commission to build the Bellamy Mansion for Dr. John D. Bellamy, one of the largest and most expensive homes built in Wilmington at the time. He assigned his assistant architect and draftsman, a fellow Northern architect named Rufus W. Bunnell whom Post had recruited from Connecticut in 1858, to create facade drawings and oversee construction. Bunnell stayed until 1860, when he moved back North to escape the rising tensions leading to the Civil War.

After the war, Post designed and/or superintended many public buildings in Wilmington, including the Post Office (no longer standing) and the New Hanover County Courthouse. He also took on many private commissions, building homes, offices, and other buildings for residents of Wilmington and surrounding areas.

=== List of buildings ===
According to his ledger records, James F. Post officially worked on over 60 projects, his entries detailing 66 different projects in the New Hanover Country area over the span of 53 years.

| Building Name | Location | Date | Status | Building Type |
|---|---|---|---|---|
| Front Street Methodist Church | Wilmington, New Hanover County | 1859 | No Longer Standing | Religious |
| St. Thomas the Apostle Roman Catholic Church | Wilmington, New Hanover County | 1845-1847; 1884 (addition) | Standing | Religious |
| Eliza Lord House | Wilmington, New Hanover County | 1850 | No Longer Standing | Residential |
| Henry Nutt House | Wilmington, New Hanover County | 1850 | No Longer Standing | Residential |
| Levi A. Hart House | Wilmington, New Hanover County | 1850 | No Longer Standing | Residential |
| Donald McRae House, or MacRae-Dix House | Wilmington, New Hanover County | 1851-1852 | Standing | Residential |
| Duncan K. McRae House, or MacRae-Willard House | Wilmington, New Hanover County | 1851-1852 | Standing | Residential |
| Edward Savage House | Wilmington, New Hanover County | 1851-1852 | Standing | Residential |
| Bennett Flanner House | Wilmington, New Hanover County | 1852 | No Longer Standing | Residential |
| S. P. Polley Carriage House | Wilmington, New Hanover County | 1852 | No Longer Standing | Transportation |
| Zebulon Latimer House | Wilmington, New Hanover County | 1852 | Standing | Residential |
| Fire House | Wilmington, New Hanover County | 1853 | No Longer Standing | Public |
| Hustin House | Wilmington, New Hanover County | 1853 | No Longer Standing | Residential |
| DeRosset Stable and Carriage House | Wilmington, New Hanover County | 1854 | No Longer Standing | Transportation |
| Mauger London House | Wilmington, New Hanover County | 1854 | No Longer Standing | Residential |
| New Hanover County Jail | Wilmington, New Hanover County | 1854 | Standing, Altered | Public |
| Scott and Baldwin Store | Wilmington, New Hanover County | 1854 | No Longer Standing | Commercial |
| Wessell-Hathaway House, or Jacob Wessell House | Wilmington, New Hanover County | 1854 | Standing | Residential |
| City Hall-Thalian Hall | Wilmington, New Hanover County | 1855-1858 | Standing | Public |
| David Smith House | Wilmington, New Hanover County | 1855 | No Longer Standing | Residential |
| Lazarus-Hill-Divine House | Wilmington, New Hanover County | 1855 | Standing | Residential |
| Levi A. Hart Slave Quarters | Wilmington, New Hanover County | 1855 | No Longer Standing | Residential |
| E.W. Hall Building | Wilmington, New Hanover County | 1857 | No Longer Standing | Commercial |
| J. Dawson Building | Wilmington, New Hanover County | 1857 | No Longer Standing | Commercial |
| J.G. Wright Building | Wilmington, New Hanover County | 1858 | No Longer Standing | Commercial |
| Mauger London Store | Wilmington, New Hanover County | 1858 | No Longer Standing | Commercial |
| Wright-Harriss-Bellamy House | Wilmington, New Hanover County | 1858 | No Longer Standing | Residential |
| Bellamy Mansion | Wilmington, New Hanover County | 1859-1861 | Standing | Residential |
| Conoley-Sidbury House | Wilmington, New Hanover County | 1859 | Standing | Residential |
| St. Paul's Evangelical Lutheran Church | Wilmington, New Hanover County | 1859-1869 | Standing | Religious |
| Von Glahn House | Wilmington, New Hanover County | 1859 | Standing | Residential |
| Elmwood, or James Grist House | Washington, Beaufort County | 1860 | Standing | Residential |
| Icehouse | Wilmington, New Hanover County | 1860 | No Longer Standing | Commercial |
| O. G. Parsley House | Wilmington, New Hanover County | 1860 | Standing | Residential |
| O. G. Parsley Store | Wilmington, New Hanover County | 1860 | No Longer Standing | Commercial |
| Martin-Huggins House | Wilmington, New Hanover County | 1870 | Standing | Residential |
| Seamen's Home | Wilmington, New Hanover County | 1873 | No Longer Standing | Public |
| Adrian House | Wilmington, New Hanover County | 1875 | Standing | Residential |
| Carolina Rice Mills | Wilmington, New Hanover County | 1880 | No Longer Standing | Industrial |
| Carolina Yacht Club | Wrightsville Beach, New Hanover County | 1883 | No Longer Standing | Recreational |
| Honnett House | Wilmington, New Hanover County | 1883 (enlargement) | Standing | Residential |
| City Hospital | Wilmington, New Hanover County | 1884 (addition) | No Longer Standing | Health Care |
| James F. Post House | Wilmington, New Hanover County | 1884 | No Longer Standing | Residential |
| S. and B. Solomon House | Wilmington, New Hanover County | 1885 | No Longer Standing | Residential |
| F. W. Kerchner Stores | Wilmington, New Hanover County | 1886 | No Longer Standing | Commercial |
| Worth and Worth Building | Wilmington, New Hanover County | 1886 | Standing | Commercial |
| Benjamin Beery House | Wilmington, New Hanover County | 1887 (remodel) | Standing | Residential |
| City Jail | Wilmington, New Hanover County | 1887 | No Longer Standing | Public |
| Delancy Evans House | Wilmington, New Hanover County | 1887 | No Longer Standing | Residential |
| Mrs. M. P. Taylor's Store | Wilmington, New Hanover County | 1887 | No Longer Standing | Commercial |
| William B. McKoy House | Wilmington, New Hanover County | 1887 | Standing | Residential |
| Pembroke Jones Cottage | Wrightsville Sound, New Hanover County | 1888 | No Longer Standing | Residential |
| United States Post Office and Courthouse | Wilmington, New Hanover County | 1888 | No Longer Standing | Public |
| Hemenway School | Wilmington, New Hanover County | 1889; 1897 (expansion) | No Longer Standing | Educational |
| Union School | Wilmington, New Hanover County | 1889 | No Longer Standing | Educational |
| Williams-Holladay House | Wilmington, New Hanover County | 1889-1890 | Standing | Residential |
| New Hanover County Courthouse | Wilmington, New Hanover County | 1891-1893 | Standing | Public |
| Strausz House, or Heide-Bridgers House | Wilmington, New Hanover County | 1891 | Standing | Residential |
| Sol Bear's Store | Wilmington, New Hanover County | 1892 | Standing | Commercial |
| Masonic Temple | Wilmington, New Hanover County | 1894 | Unbuilt | Fraternal |
| MacRae Building, or S. H. Fishblates Store Front | Wilmington, New Hanover County | 1895 | Standing | Commercial |
| Ebenezer Baptist Church | Wilmington, New Hanover County | 1896 | No Longer Standing | Religious |
| Oakdale Cemetery Gate | Wilmington, New Hanover County | 1896 | Standing | Public |
| Oakdale Cemetery Lodge | Wilmington, New Hanover County | 1896-1897 | No Longer Standing | Public |
| Goodman Building | Wilmington, New Hanover County | 1897 | Standing | Commercial |
| I. Shrier Store | Wilmington, New Hanover County | 1897 | Standing | Commercial |
| Sol Bear Beach or Sound House | Wrightsville Beach, New Hanover County | 1897 | No Longer Standing | Residential |

== Military service ==
The American Civil War began April 12, 1861, with North Carolina officially succeeding from the Union to join the Confederate States of America on May 20, 1861.

At the beginning of the war, James F. Post served in the North Carolina 2nd Artillery Regiment, also known as the 36th Regiment Volunteers or the “Cape Fear Regiment,” in 1st Company A, also known as “Wilmington Horse Artillery.” He rose to the rank of Second Lieutenant on June 18, 1861. He was not re-elected at the company’s reorganization on April 15, 1862, and was released from duty to civilian life on April 27, 1862.

Following his discharge, he continued to contribute to the Confederate war effort, employed by the Confederate government for building and repairing various military structures at installations such as Fort Fisher, Fort Anderson, and other locations that worked to protect to Wilmington’s harbor, which was not only a major Confederate port at the time but also one of the last ports still available to blockade runners until the fall of Fort Fisher in 1864.

== Death ==
Post died on July 15, 1899, at the age of 80.
