= Adrian Boucher =

French architect (c. 1760 – 1804)

- Born: c. 1760
- Died: 1804 (aged 43–44)
- Occupation: Architect
- Buildings: City Exchange, Savannah, Georgia

Adrian Boucher (c. 1760 – 1804) was a French architect who came to prominence after emigrating to the United States in the late 18th century. He was considered amongst the top European talent involved in the construction of post-colonial America, and became the first architect to work in Savannah, Georgia.

== Life and career ==
Boucher was born in France around 1760. He left his homeland for the United States, in the late 18th century, as a refugee of the French Revolution. He arrived in New York City, where he worked as a draftsman for noted architect brothers and his compatriots Joseph-François and Charles Mangin.

In 1799, one of Boucher's works, the City Exchange, in Savannah, Georgia, was completed. He had arrived in the city to assist in its reconstruction after the 1796 fire and became one of the early influencers of the growth of the city, along with cartographer John William Gerard de Brahm.

Boucher designed the second of three incarnations of Savannah's Christ Church, the construction of which began in 1801 but was leveled during the 1804 Antigua–Charleston hurricane.

He was included on 1799 and 1802 lists of defaulters in Chatham County.

== Death ==
Boucher died in 1804, aged around 44.
