= Telfair Arms Apartments =

1886 historic building in Georgia, USA

Coordinates: 32.06446°N 81.09652°W

Telfair Arms Apartments, formerly Telfair Hospital, is a historic building constructed in 1886 in Savannah, Georgia. It was designed by Alfred Eichberg.
