= Alfred Eichberg =

American architect (1859–1921)

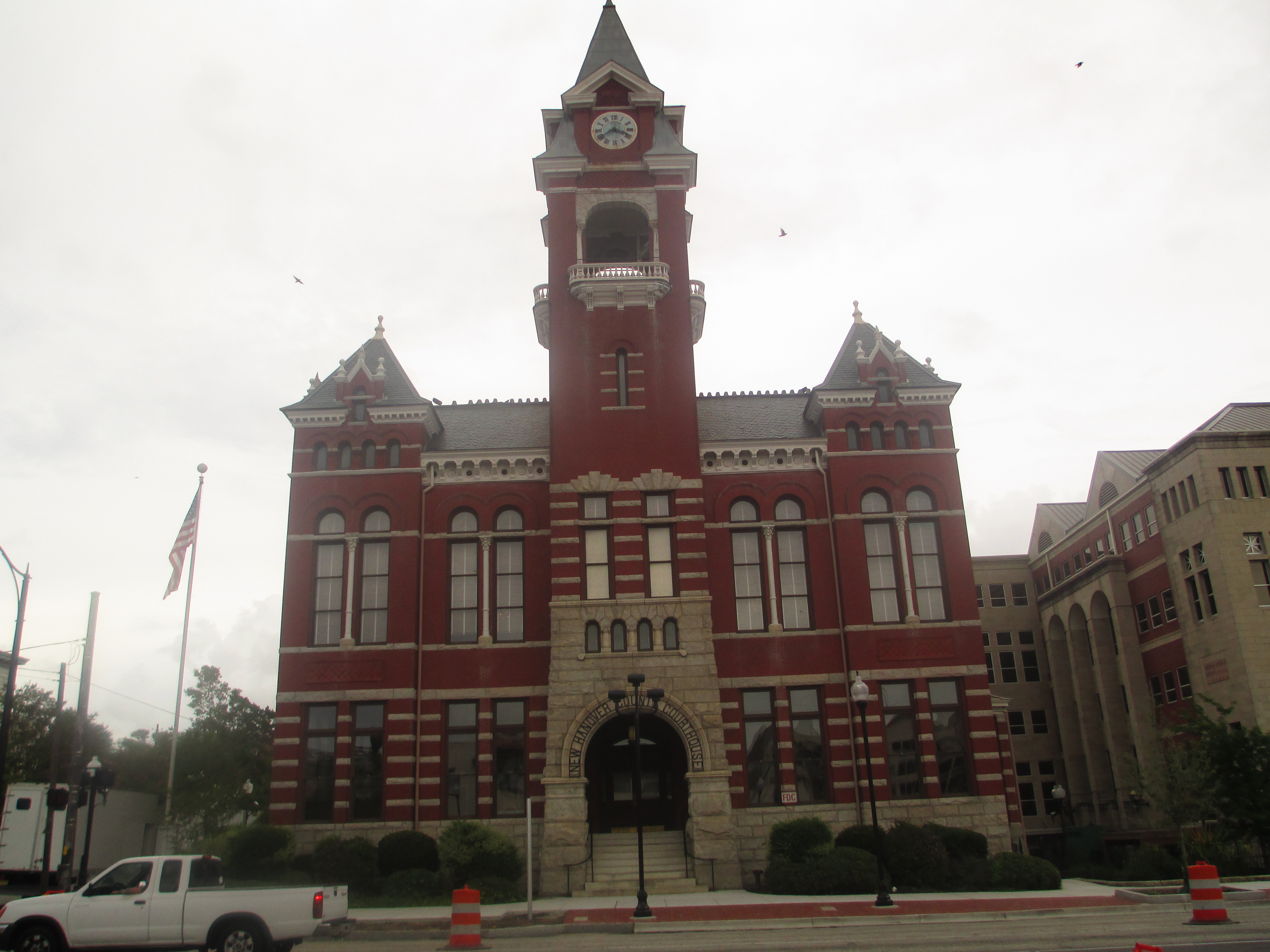
New Hanover County Courthouse

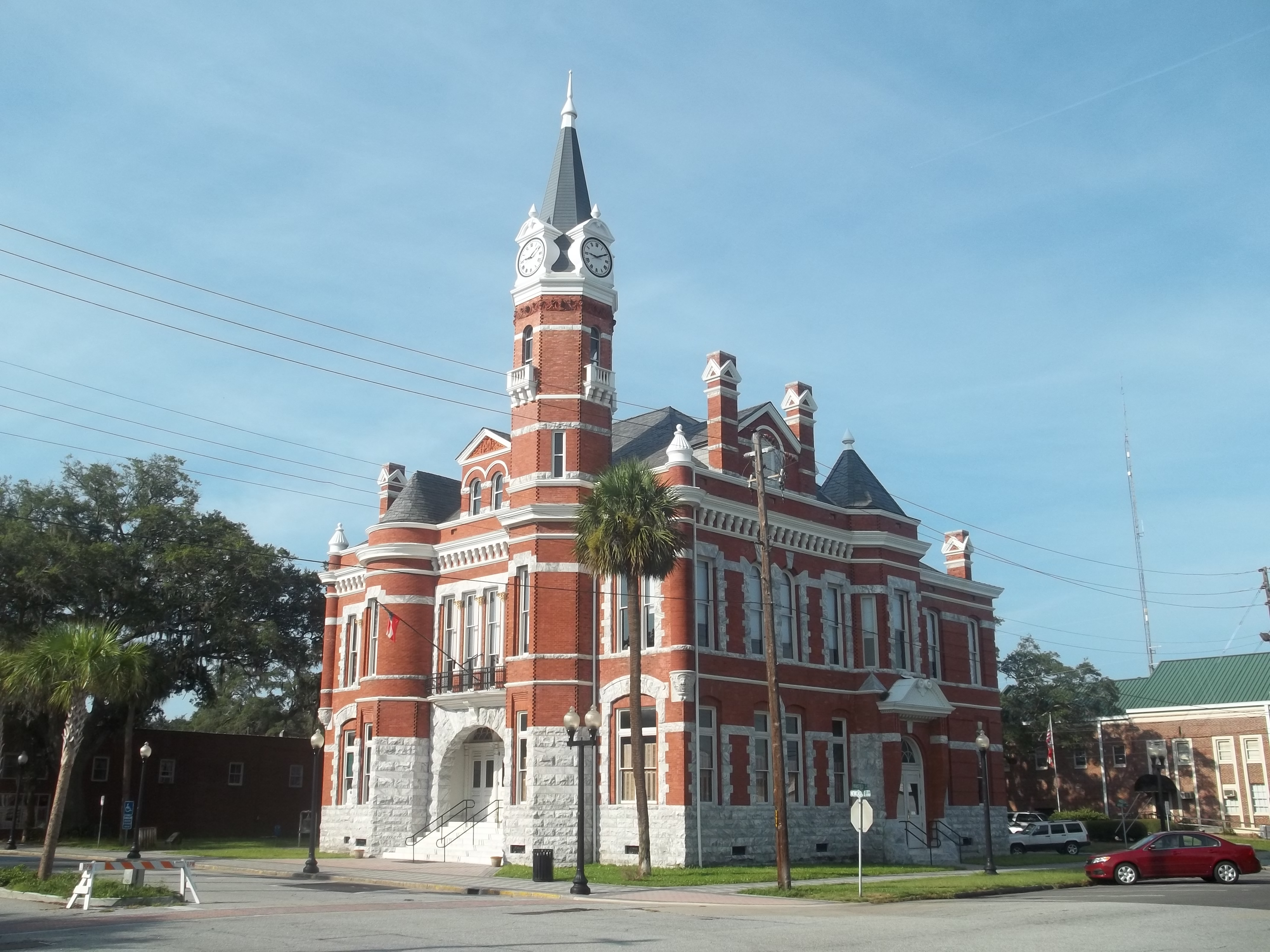
Old Brunswick City Hall

Alfred Salom Eichberg (August 23, 1859 – May 15, 1921) was an architect in the U.S. state of Georgia. He designed the F. Rheinstein and Company Building (North Carolina), the New Hanover County Courthouse (North Carolina), Brunswick City Hall (1889), and Glynn Academy's Annex Building. He was Jewish.

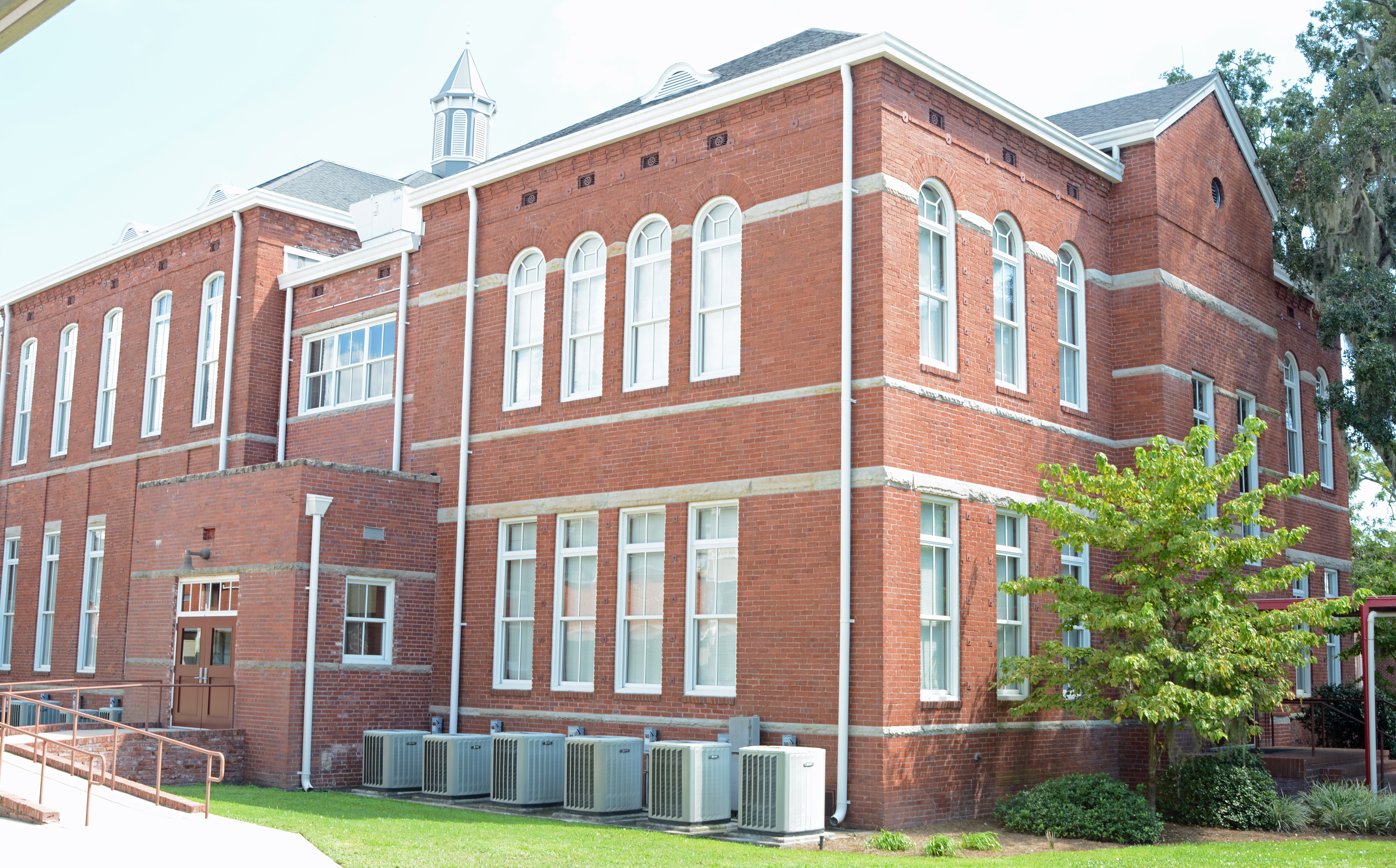
Glynn Academy - Annex Building

He partnered with Calvin Fay (formerly of Sholl & Fay) to form Fay and Eichberg (1881–1888). They designed small buildings for the International Cotton Exposition (1881) in Atlanta and obtained larger commissions in Atlanta and Savannah including the Atlanta Chamber of Commerce, Telfair Hospital, and Central of Georgia Railway building (now called Clark Hall). He established his own firm in Savannah, Georgia. He employed Hyman Witcover as a draftsman and then partnered with him. He is buried at Oakland Cemetery in Atlanta.

== Work ==
- Savannah Powder Magazine (1898) with Hyman Witcover
