= Ardsley Park–Chatham Crescent Historic District =

Historic district in Georgia, United States

- U.S. National Register of Historic Places
- U.S. Historic district
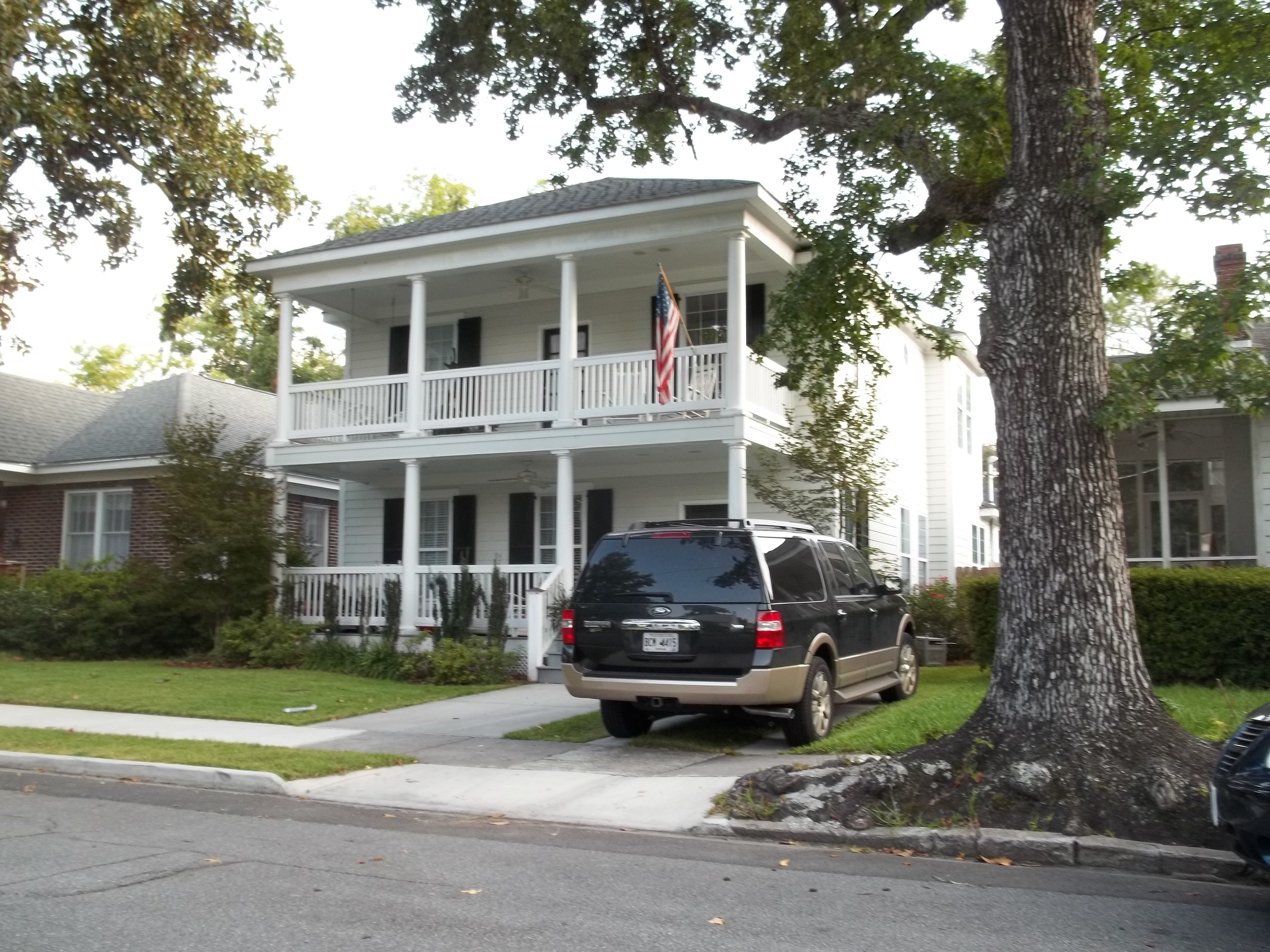

- Location within Georgia
- Location: Between Victory Drive, Bull Street, Waters Avenue, and 54th Lane, Savannah, Georgia
- Coordinates: 32.047222°N 81.095°W
- Area: 400 acres (1.6 km^{2})
- Architect: Multiple
- Architectural style: Late 19th and 20th Century Revivals, Late 19th and Early 20th Century American Movements, Late Victorian
- NRHP reference No.: 85001787
- Added to NRHP: August 15, 1985

The Ardsley Park–Chatham Crescent Historic District is a historic district in Savannah, Georgia, United States. Covering 400 acres (1.6 km^{2}), the district was first listed in the National Register of Historic Places in 1985. It includes 998 buildings deemed to be contributing resources, with boundaries defined as Victory Drive (north), 54th lane (south), Bull Street (west), and Waters Avenue (east).

The district centers on a large residential neighborhood of wood-frame houses developed in 1909–1910 as two subdivisions: Ardsley Park to the west of Habersham Street, and Chatham Crescent to its east. The area's three architectural styles are Late 19th and 20th Century Revivals, Late 19th and Early 20th Century American Movements, and Late Victorian.

Houses in the district were designed by leading Savannah architects of the early 20th century, including Henrik Wallin, Hyman Witcover, Cletus Bergen, George B. Clark, E. Lynn Drummond, Morton Levy, Olaf Otto, Percy Sudgen, and Henry Urban.

== Neighboring districts ==
- Lamara Heights
- Abercorn Heights
- Edgemore
- Parkside
- Olin Heights
