= New Hanover County Courthouse =

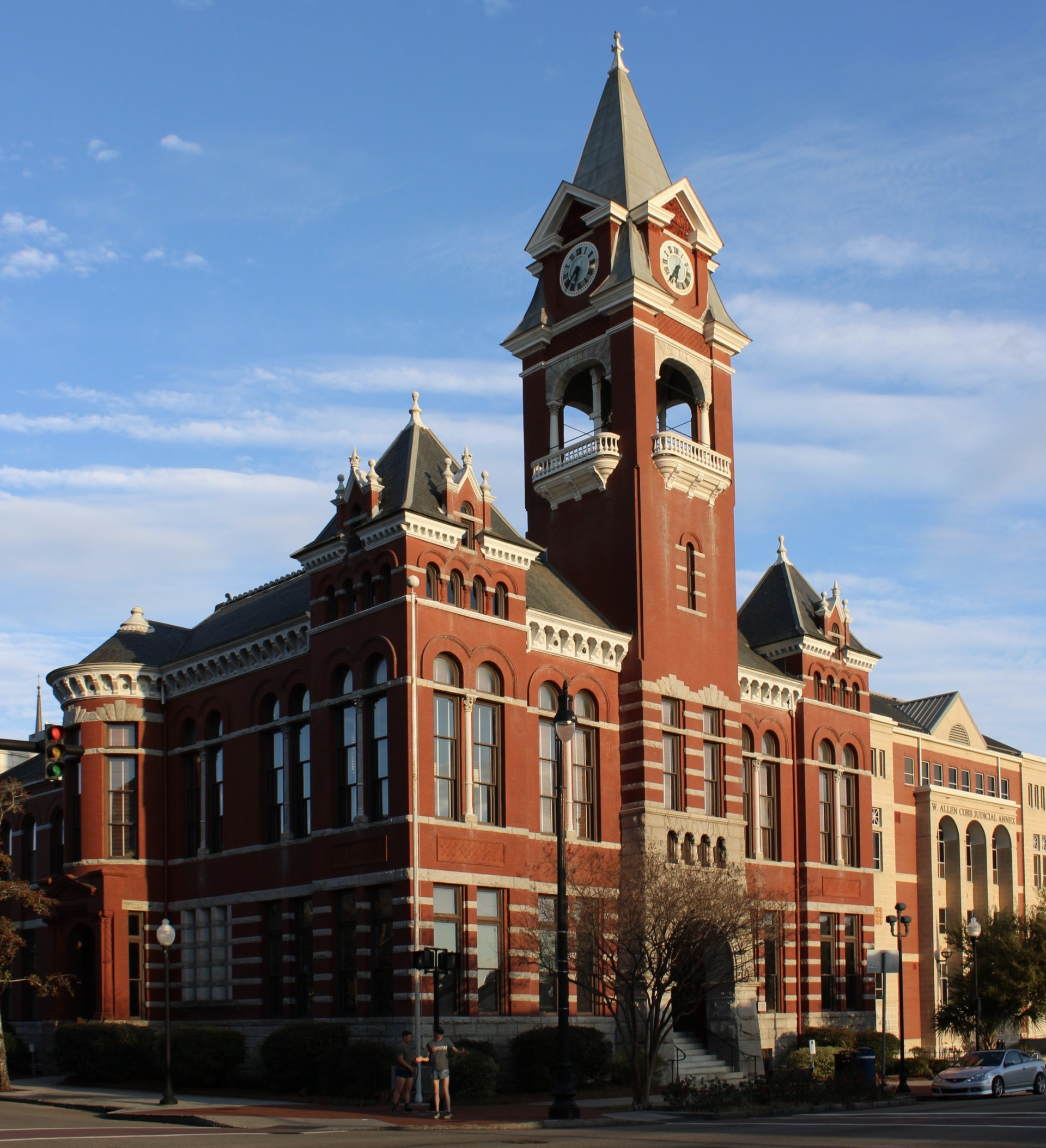
New Hanover County Courthouse

New Hanover County Courthouse is a historic courthouse building located in Wilmington, North Carolina and is the seat of New Hanover County. It was designed by Alfred Eichberg and James F. Post. The courthouse was erected in 1892 at corner of 3rd Street and Princess Street. An annex was built in 1925.
