= William Jasper Monument =

Coordinates: 32°04′25″N 81°05′38″W

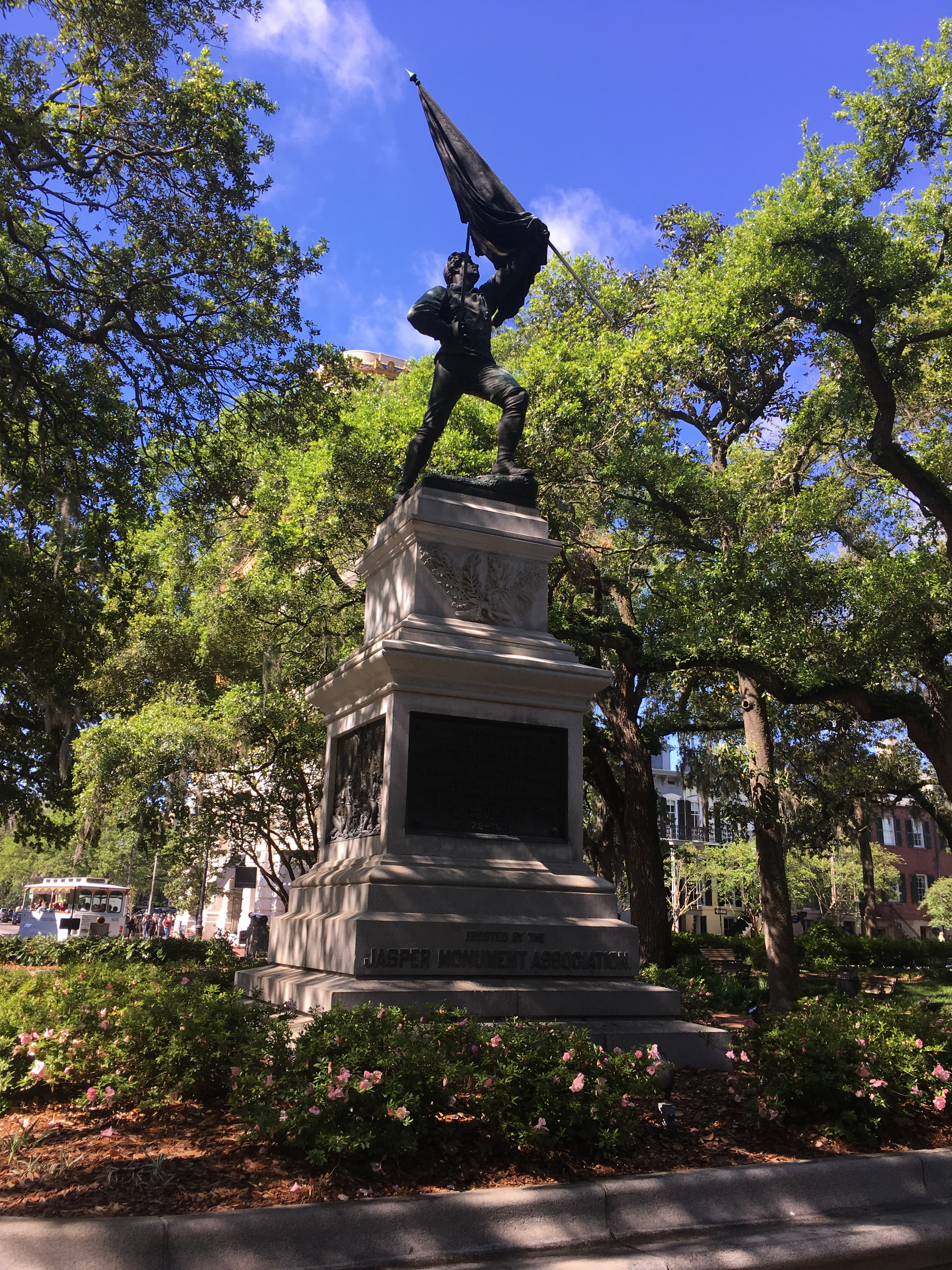
- William Jasper Monument (2018)
- Interactive map of William Jasper Monument
- Location: Madison Square, Savannah, Georgia, United States
- Designer: Alexander Doyle
- Material: Bronze; Granite (pedestal)
- Height: 15.5 feet (4.7 m)
- Dedicated date: February 2, 1888
- Dedicated to: William Jasper

The William Jasper Monument is a monument honoring William Jasper in Savannah, Georgia, United States. Located in Madison Square, the monument was designed by Alexander Doyle and dedicated in 1888.

== History ==
William Jasper was a sergeant in the Continental Army during the American Revolutionary War. During the Battle of Sullivan's Island in 1776, he earned fame by climbing a parapet under enemy fire to reattach his company's flag after the flagpole was destroyed. For his action, he was commended by John Rutledge, the then-President of South Carolina. He was later killed in action during the siege of Savannah on October 9, 1779.

On February 2, 1888, a monument honoring Jasper was dedicated in Madison Square in Savannah, Georgia. The monument, located near the De Soto Hotel in Savannah, was designed by Alexander Doyle and depicts Jasper during the siege of Savannah. Several prominent Savannah citizens, including Ireland native William Kehoe, had been members of the association responsible for the monument's creation. The mayor and aldermen were present at the monument's dedication, where then-Georgia Governor John Brown Gordon gave a speech. Then-President of the United States Grover Cleveland and First Lady of the United States Frances Cleveland were guests of honor, with the President stopping on his way to Jacksonville, Florida and honoring the occasion with a drive through the city.

In 1957, a Georgia historical marker was erected near the monument.

== Design ==
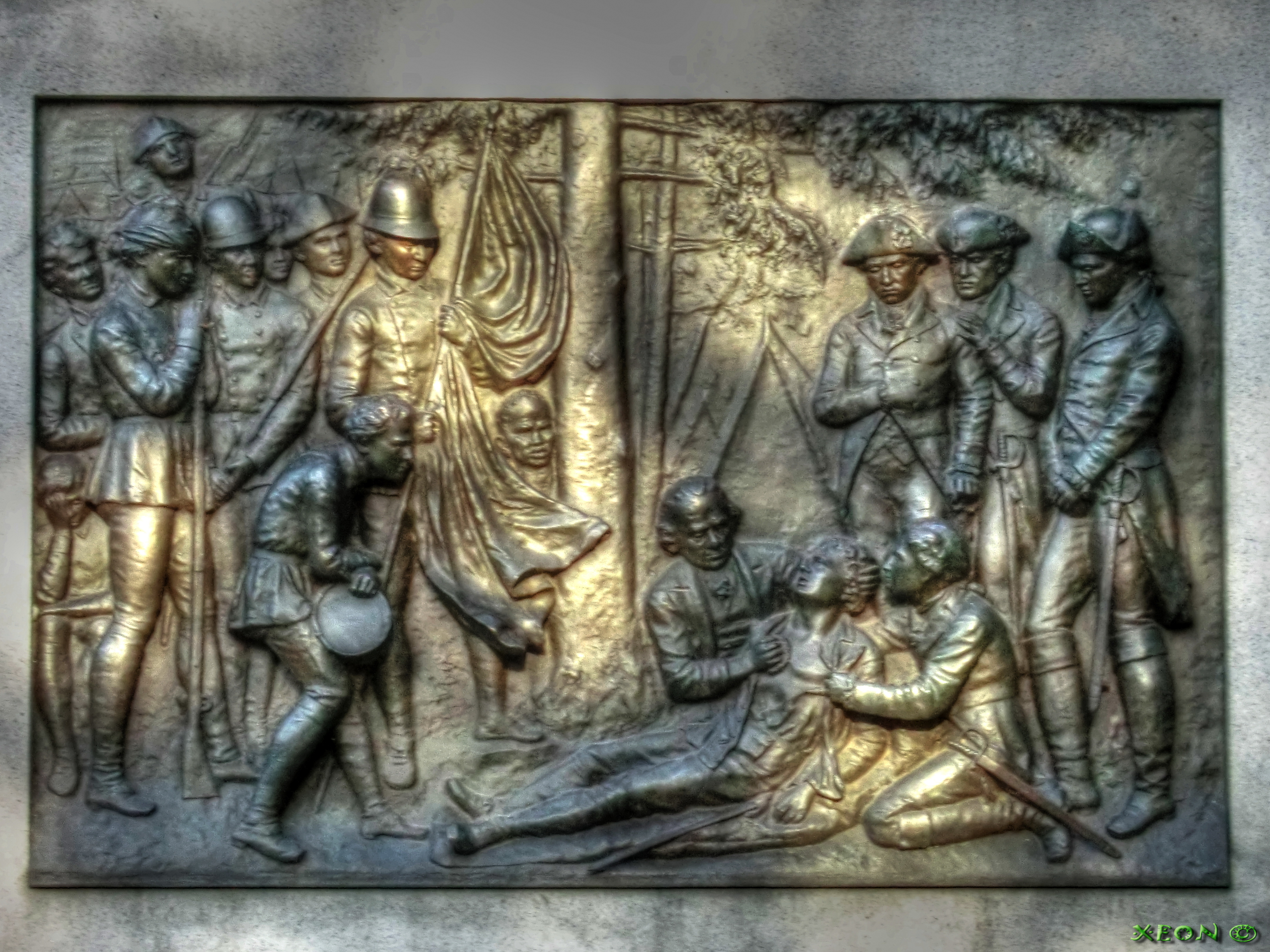
Bas-relief on the monument

The bronze statue of Jasper, topping a granite pedestal, shows him in a heroic pose, holding the Moultrie Flag above his head in his left hand and a sword in his right. Near his feet is his bullet-ridden hat. Three bas-reliefs on the base of the monument depict scenes from Jasper's life. The height of the monument is 15.5 feet (4.7 m). An inscription on the front base of the monument reads:

To the memory of Sergeant William Jasper, who, though mortally wounded, rescued the colors of his regiment, in the assault on the British lines about the city, October 9, 1779. A century has not dimmed the glory of the Irish-American soldier whose last tribute to civil liberty was his life. 1779–1879. Erected by the Jasper Monument Association.

== See also ==
- 1888 in art

== Bibliography ==
- Carrington, Henry Beebee (1892). Columbian Selections: American Patriotism. For Home and School. J. B. Lippincott & Co. – via Google Books.
- "Sergeant Jasper". Georgia Historical Society. June 16, 2014.
- Knight, Lucian Lamar (1917). A Standard History of Georgia and Georgians. Vol. I. Lewis Publishing Company – via Google Books.
- Martin, Scott; Harris, Bernard F. Jr. (2017). Savannah 1779: The British turn south. Osprey Publishing. ISBN 978-1-4728-1866-9 – via Google Books.
- "JASPER MEMORIAL WORK OF ALEXANDER DOYLE". The American Stone Trade. XVI (4). November 1, 1916 – via Google Books.
