= Bull Street =

Prominent street in Savannah, Georgia

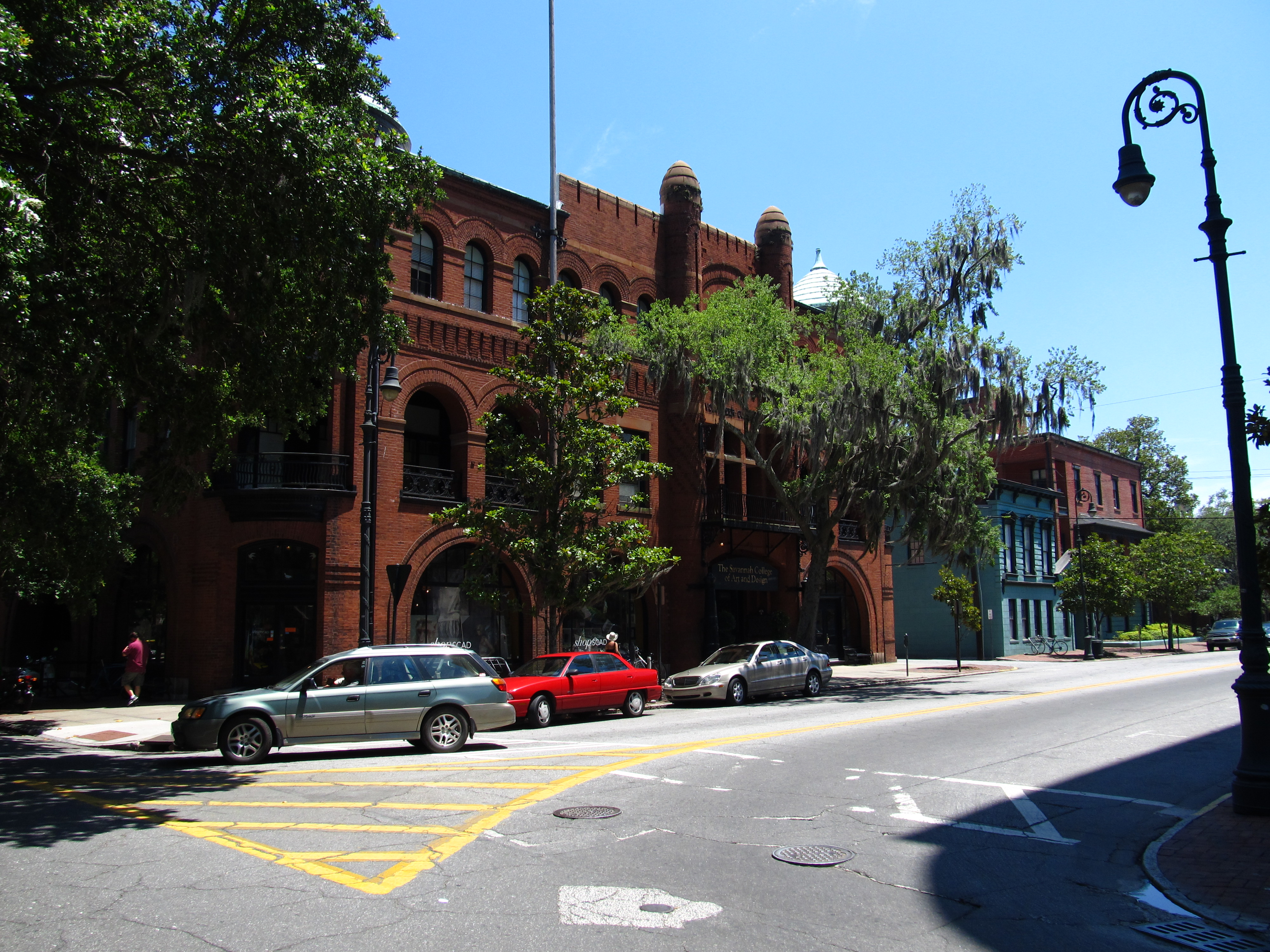
- Savannah College of Art and Design's (SCAD) Poetter Hall at 342 Bull Street, immediately south of Madison Square
- Namesake: William Bull
- Length: 3.39 mi (5.46 km)
- Location: Savannah, Georgia, U.S.
- North end: Bay Street
- South end: Derenne Avenue

Bull Street is a major street in Savannah, Georgia, United States. Named for Colonel William Bull (1683–1755), it runs from Bay Street in the north to Derenne Avenue (part of State Route 21) in the south. It is around 3.40 miles in length, not including the section interrupted by Forsyth Park. It is the center of a National Historic Landmark District.

Savannah City Hall sits opposite the northern end of Bull Street, on Bay Street.

Bull Street goes around five of Savannah's 22 squares. They are (from north to south):

- Johnson Square
- Wright Square
- Chippewa Square
- Madison Square
- Monterey Square

A memorial in the Oglethorpe Avenue median marks what is today known as the Bull Street Cemetery, with a plaque stating: "Original 1733 burial plot allotted by James Edward Oglethorpe to the Savannah Jewish Community". On November 3, 1761, George III "conveyed a certain half lot of land in Holland Tything, Percival Ward, to David Truan." This land was at the northwest corner of today's Bull Street and Oglethorpe Avenue. Several Jews were interred here before the family cemeteries were established.

== Notable buildings and structures ==
Below is a selection of notable buildings and structures on Bull Street, all in Savannah's Historic District. From north to south:

Name	Ward	Image	Address	Date	Note
The Citizens and Southern Bank	Derby Ward		22 Bull Street	1907	now Bank of America
Christ Church	Derby Ward		28 Bull Street	1838/1897	
Lutheran Church of the Ascension	Percival Ward		120 Bull Street (21 East State Street, includes Drayton Street)	1879	
Tomochichi Federal Building and United States Courthouse	Percival Ward		125 Bull Street	1899	
Independent Presbyterian Church	Brown Ward		207 Bull Street	1817/1891	
The Savannah Theatre	Brown Ward		222 Bull Street	1820	
James Oglethorpe Monument	Brown Ward		Chippewa Square	1910	
First Baptist Church	Brown Ward		223 Bull Street	1833/1922	
Masonic Temple	Jasper Ward		341 Bull Street	1912	now the Gryphon Tea Room, by Freemason Hyman W. Witcover
Poetter Hall	Jasper Ward		340-344 Bull Street	1893	by William G. Preston
St. John's Episcopal Church	Jasper Ward		325 Bull Street	1853	by Calvin N. Otis
Charles W. Rogers Duplex	Monterey Ward		423-425 Bull Street	1858	by John S. Norris; later the home of Lee Adler and his wife Emma
Mercer Williams House	Monterey Ward		429 Bull Street	1871	by John S. Norris, restored by James Arthur Williams
440 Bull Street	Monterey Ward		440 Bull Street	1900	
Armstrong House	Monterey Ward		447 Bull Street	1917	now the Armstrong Kessler Mansion; formerly bought and restored by James Arthur Williams
Edmund Molyneux House	Monterey Ward		450 Bull Street	1857	now The Oglethorpe Club, by John S. Norris

The Gingerbread House, a popular tourist attraction in the Savannah Victorian Historic District, is at 1921 Bull Street, opposite Bull Street Library. It was built by Cord Asendorf Sr. in 1899.

== References in popular culture ==
The street is also featured several times in John Berendt's 1994 book Midnight in the Garden of Good and Evil. In the introduction to the subsequent 1997 movie, Irma P. Hall's character Minerva says to a squirrel sat beside her on a bench in Forsyth Park: "Quit eyeballin' me, Flavis. I knew you when you was a two-bit hustler on Bull Street."
