= Hyman Witcover =

American architect

- Witcover in 1904
- Born: July 16, 1871; Darlington, South Carolina, U.S.
- Died: October 2, 1936 (aged 65); Darlington, South Carolina, U.S.
- Occupation: Architect

Hyman Wallace Witcover (July 16, 1871 – October 2, 1936) was an architect prominent in Savannah, Georgia. He worked as a draftsman for Alfred Eichberg and eventually partnered with him.

== Life and career ==
Witcover was born in Darlington, South Carolina, in 1871, to Wolf and Dora.

At age 17, he moved to Savannah, Georgia, where he began work as a draftsman for noted architect Alfred Eichberg.

Witcover served on the board of the Congregation Mickve Israel and on the first board of Savannah's public library.

He served in the Georgia Hussars as a private, and was also in the Freemasonry fraternity.

Witcover married Agnes Dillon.

== Death ==
Witcover died on October 2, 1936, in his hometown of Darlington, where he had returned to live with two of his sons. He was 65. He is interred in Fort Lincoln Cemetery in Brentwood, Maryland, alongside his wife, who predeceased him by four years.

=== Notable works ===
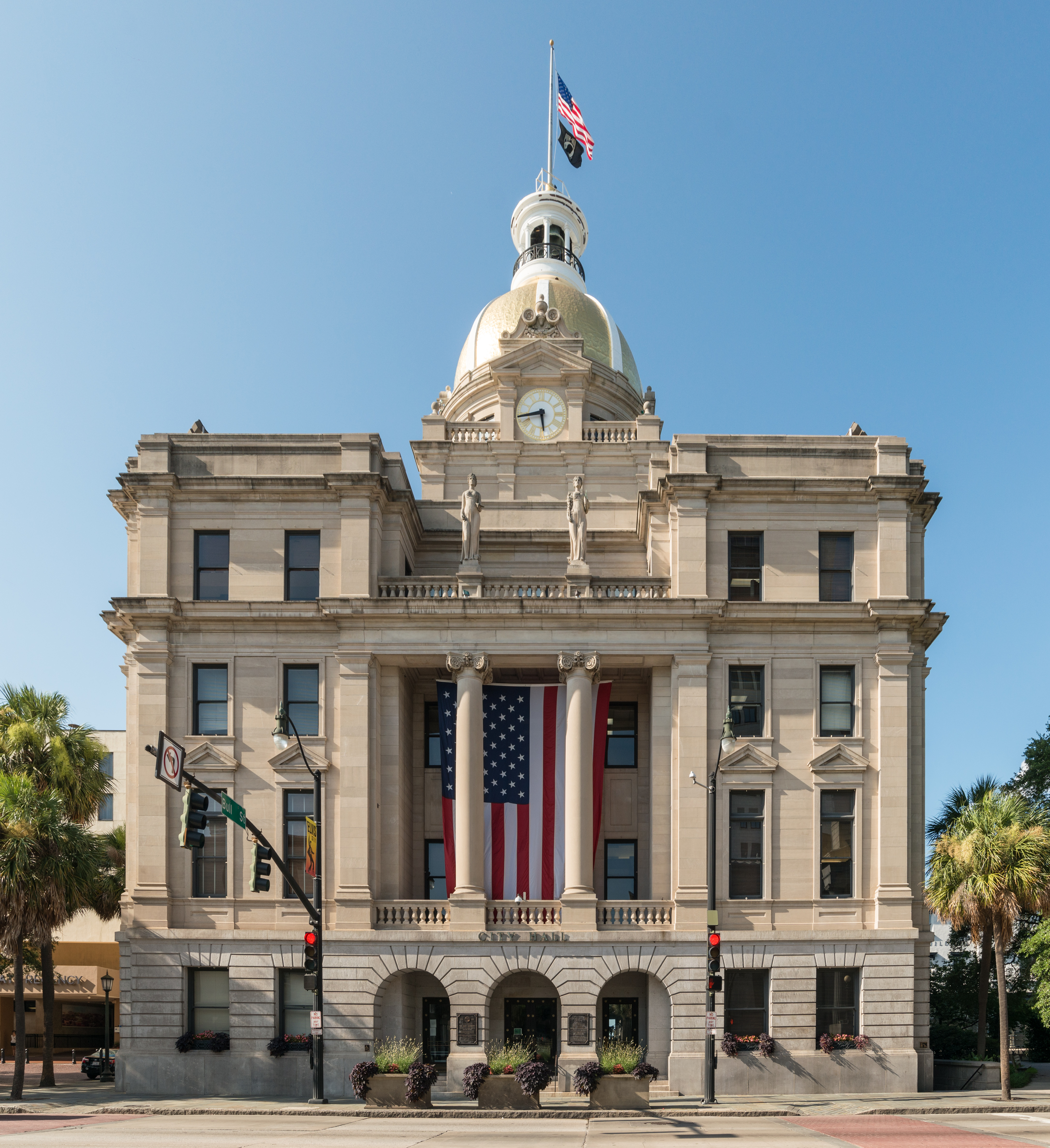
Savannah City Hall, Witcover's most noted design

- One or more works in Savannah's Ardsley Park-Chatham Crescent Historic District
- Old Effingham County Courthouse, Springfield, Georgia
- Germania Bank (1904, later known as the Blun Building, demolished in 1975)
- Savannah City Hall, Savannah, Georgia (1905)
- Hicks Hotel (circa 1914)
- Scottish Rite Masonic Temple, Savannah, Georgia (1912)
- Liberty Bank and Trust (1915)
- Bnai Brith Jacob synagogue
- Old Judicial Building, Montgomery, Alabama, as a Scottish Rite Temple (1926)
