= Savannah City Hall =

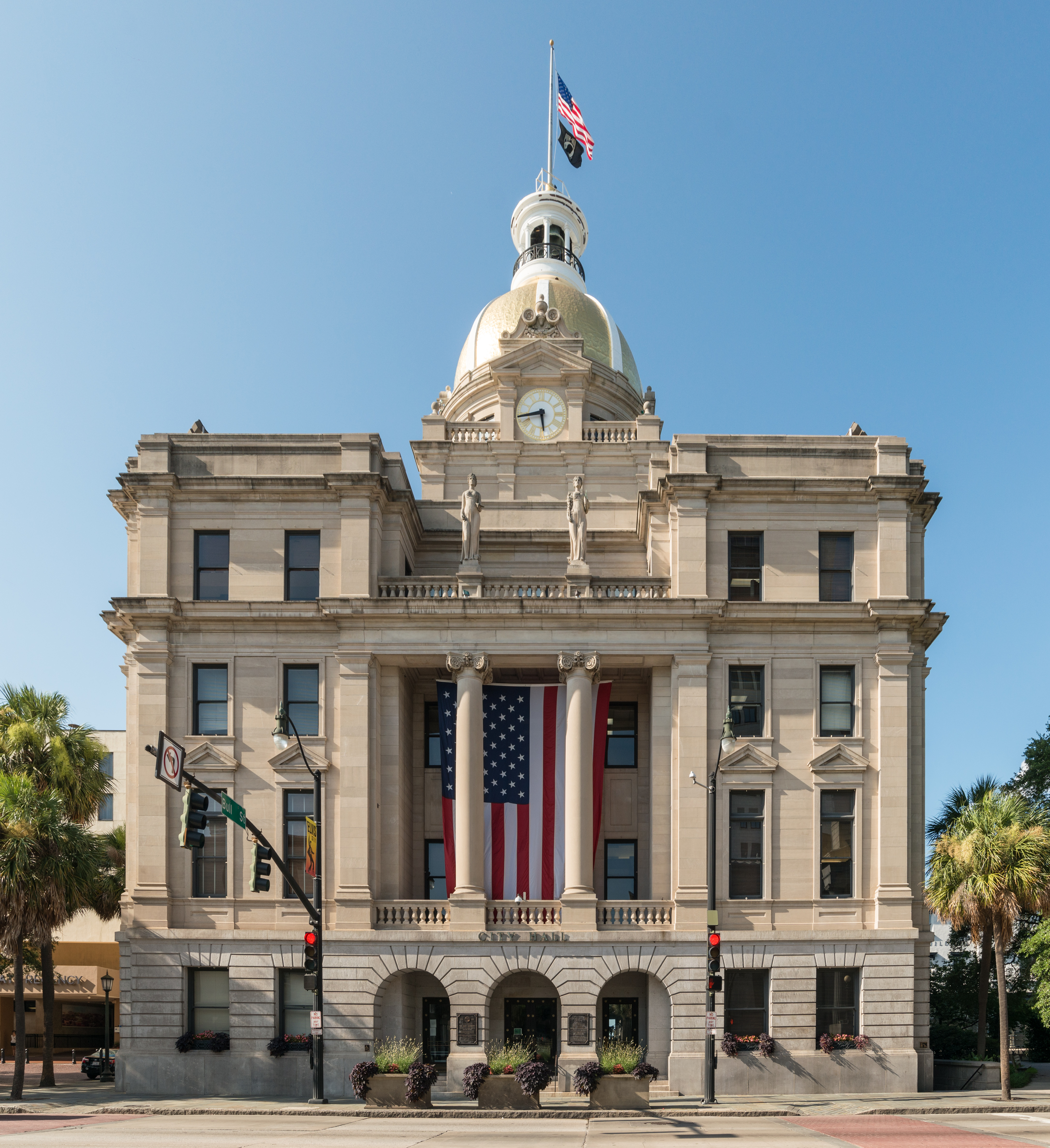
- Pictured in 2016

- Location within Georgia Location within the United States

General information
- Architectural style: Renaissance Revival
- Location: 2 East Bay Street; Savannah, Georgia, United States
- Coordinates: 32°4′52″N 81°5′28″W
- Groundbreaking: August 11, 1904
- Completed: 1905
- Opened: January 2, 1906
- Cost: $250,000

Height
- Height: 139.99 feet (42.67 m)

Technical details
- Floor count: 6
- Lifts/elevators: 1

Design and construction
- Architect: Hyman Witcover
- Savannah City Hall
- U.S. National Historic Landmark District – Contributing property
- Location within Georgia Location within the United States
- Part of: Savannah Historic District (ID66000277)
- Designated NHLDCP: November 13, 1966

References
- "Emporis building ID 124515". Emporis. Archived from the original on November 6, 2020.

Savannah City Hall is the seat of government for the city of Savannah, Georgia, United States. Designed by architect Hyman Witcover, the building was built between 1904 and 1905 and opened the following year. It is a contributing property to the Savannah Historic District.

== History ==
The location for the city hall was formerly home to the City Exchange, which had been built in 1799 and was demolished in 1904. Following the building's demolition, the cornerstone for the city hall was laid on August 11, 1904, in a large ceremony. The architect behind the project was Hyman Witcover, who is notable for several other buildings in the area, while construction was handled by the Savannah Contracting Company. The construction occurred during the administration of Savannah Mayor Herman Myers, who pursued numerous public works projects during his tenure as mayor. Commenting on the building, Myers reported that, "it will typify the twentieth century Savannah, the Savannah of indomitable energy, of punishing progressiveness," and that the building is "a monument to the progressive spirit that marks the Savannah of today." The building was the first building built solely to serve as the seat of government for the city.

The construction of the building cost upwards of $250,000 and was completed in 1905. The building, located across the street from the United States Customhouse, is an example of Renaissance Revival architecture and featured an exterior of limestone and granite, capped by a copper dome. Initial plans called for four statues of chariots on the tops of the building's four corners, but financial limitations prevented this. The building officially opened on January 2, 1906. In 1987, the dome was covered in gold leaf, the work of Hussey Gay Bell architects. In 2014, the Georgia Historical Society, working with the mayor and aldermen, erected a Georgia historical marker at the city hall.

== Bibliography ==
- Dick, Susan E.; Johnson, Mandi D. (2001). Savannah, 1733 to 2000:: Photographs from the Collection of the Georgia Historical Society. Arcadia Publishing. ISBN 978-0-7385-0688-3 – via Google Books.
- "Savannah City Hall". Georgia Historical Society. June 16, 2014. Archived from the original on September 19, 2020.
- Harden, William (1913). A History of Savannah and South Georgia. Vol. II. Lewis Publishing Company – via Google Books.
- Kelley, David E. (2000). Building Savannah. Arcadia Publishing. ISBN 978-0-7385-0573-2 – via Google Books.
- Triplett, Whip Morrison (2006). Savannah. Postcard History Series. Arcadia Publishing. ISBN 978-0-7385-4209-6 – via Google Books.
