= Thomas Holcombe =

American merchant (1815–1885)

- Born: 1815; Beaufort, South Carolina, U.S.
- Died: December 30, 1885 (aged 69–70); DeWitt, Georgia, U.S.
- Resting place: Laurel Grove Cemetery, Savannah, Georgia, U.S.
- Spouse(s): Eliza A. Gale (m. –1853; her death); Frances Elizabeth Wellborn (m. 1854–1885; his death)

Thomas Holcombe (1815 – December 30, 1885) was an American merchant. He was a mayor of Savannah, Georgia, during the American Civil War, in which he served as a colonel.

== Life and career ==
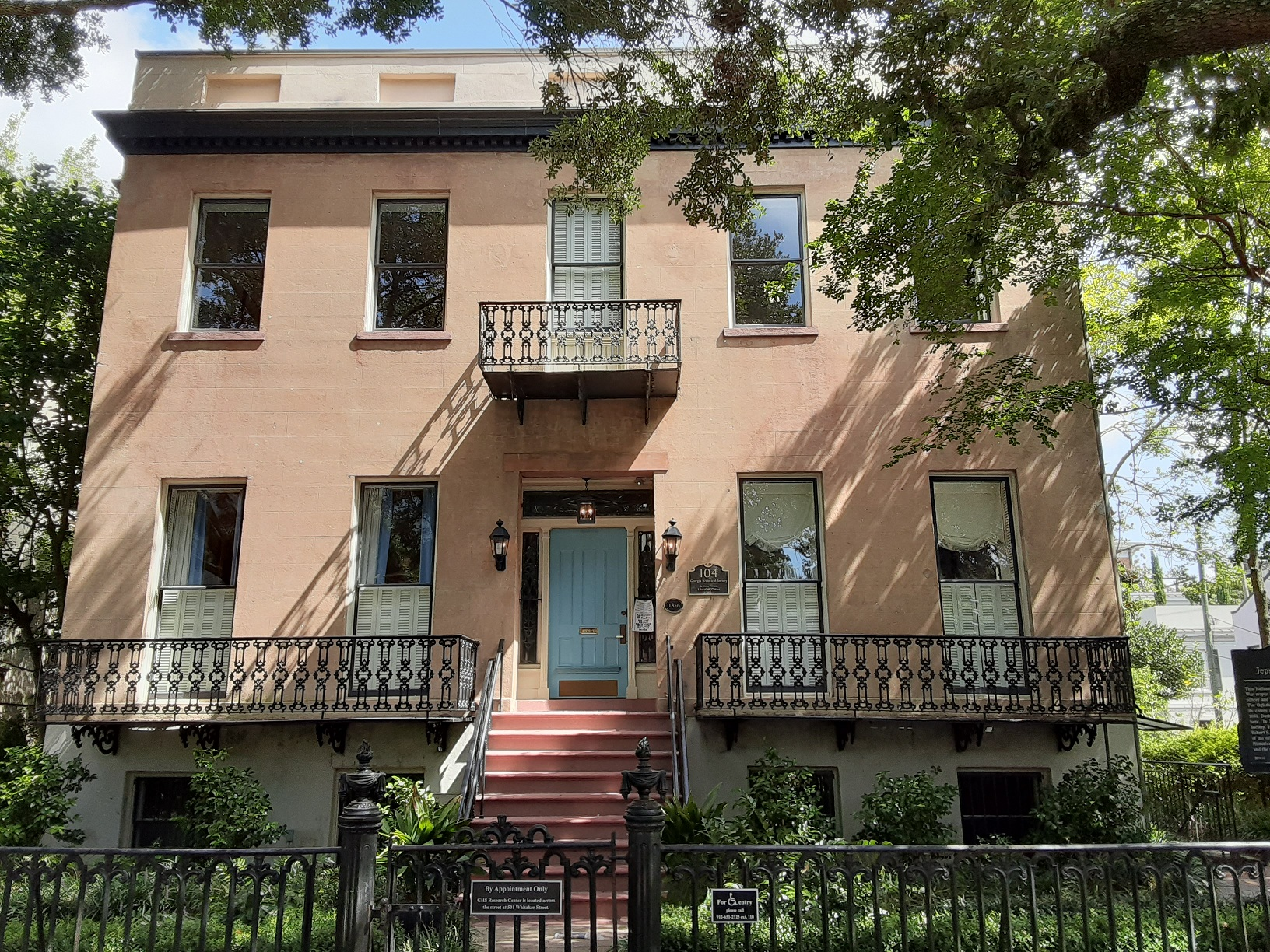
The Thomas Holcombe House at 104 West Gaston Street in Savannah. It was built in 1856.

Holcombe was born in 1815 in Beaufort, South Carolina. His family moved to St. Marys, Georgia, when Holcombe was still young. He later moved to Savannah, where he established a partnership in the grocery business, Huntingdon and Holcombe, on Bay Street (between Whitaker Street and Barnard Street) in 1836. It later became Crane and Holcombe, Holcombe; Johnson and Company; and Holcombe, Hull and Company.

He married twice; firstly, to Eliza A. Gale, with whom he had three known children: Josiah, Edward and Isaac. After her death in 1853, he married Frances Elizabeth Wellborn the following year. He had five known children with her: Julia, Robert, John, Nannie and Fanny. In 1856, he had built what is now known as the Thomas Holcombe House at the northwestern corner of Savannah's Forsyth Park.

In the American Civil War, which began in 1861, Holcombe became a colonel under Joseph E. Brown, the 42nd governor of Georgia.

Holcombe was elected mayor of Savannah in 1862, having previously been an alderman.

== Death ==
Holcombe died in 1885 in DeWitt, Georgia, aged 69 or 70. He was living on Houston Street in Savannah at the time, having moved from his West Gaston Street home. He was interred in the city's Laurel Grove Cemetery beside his first wife. His widow, Frances, was buried in Albany, Georgia, upon her death in 1919.
