= Gaston Street =

Prominent street in Savannah, Georgia

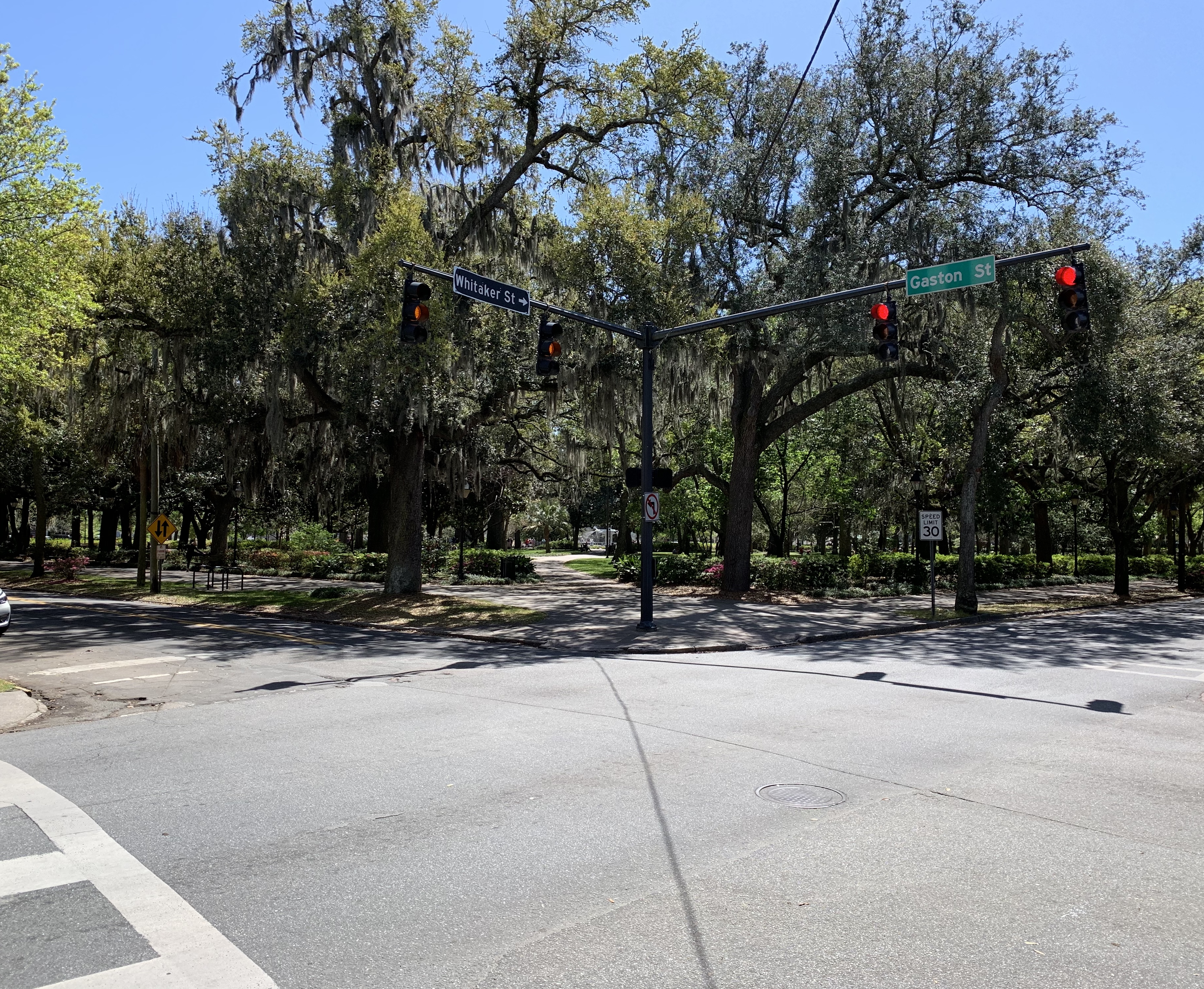
- Gaston Street at Whitaker Street, at the northwestern corner of Forsyth Park
- Namesake: William Gaston
- Length: 0.77 mi (1.24 km)
- Location: Savannah, Georgia, U.S.
- West end: Martin Luther King Jr. Boulevard
- East end: East Broad Street

Gaston Street is a prominent street in Savannah, Georgia, United States. Located south of Gordon Street, it runs for about 0.77 miles (1.24 km) from Martin Luther King Jr. Boulevard in the west to East Broad Street in the east. Originally known only as Gaston Street singular, its addresses are now split between "West Gaston Street" and "East Gaston Street", the transition occurring at Bull Street in the center of the downtown area. The final block of East Gaston Street, from Price Street to East Broad Street, is offset to the north by a few yards from the rest of the street. Named for William Gaston, a prominent Savannahian merchant, the street is entirely within Savannah Historic District, a National Historic Landmark District.

Gaston Street forms the northern edge of Forsyth Park in the street's central section, intersecting with Whitaker Street on its western side and Drayton Street on its eastern side. The acronym NOG (North of Gaston) is used colloquially to separate two distinct parts of Savannah: the historic section, from the Savannah River to the northern edge of Forsyth Park, and the less desirable part to the south of Gaston Street.

== Notable buildings and structures ==
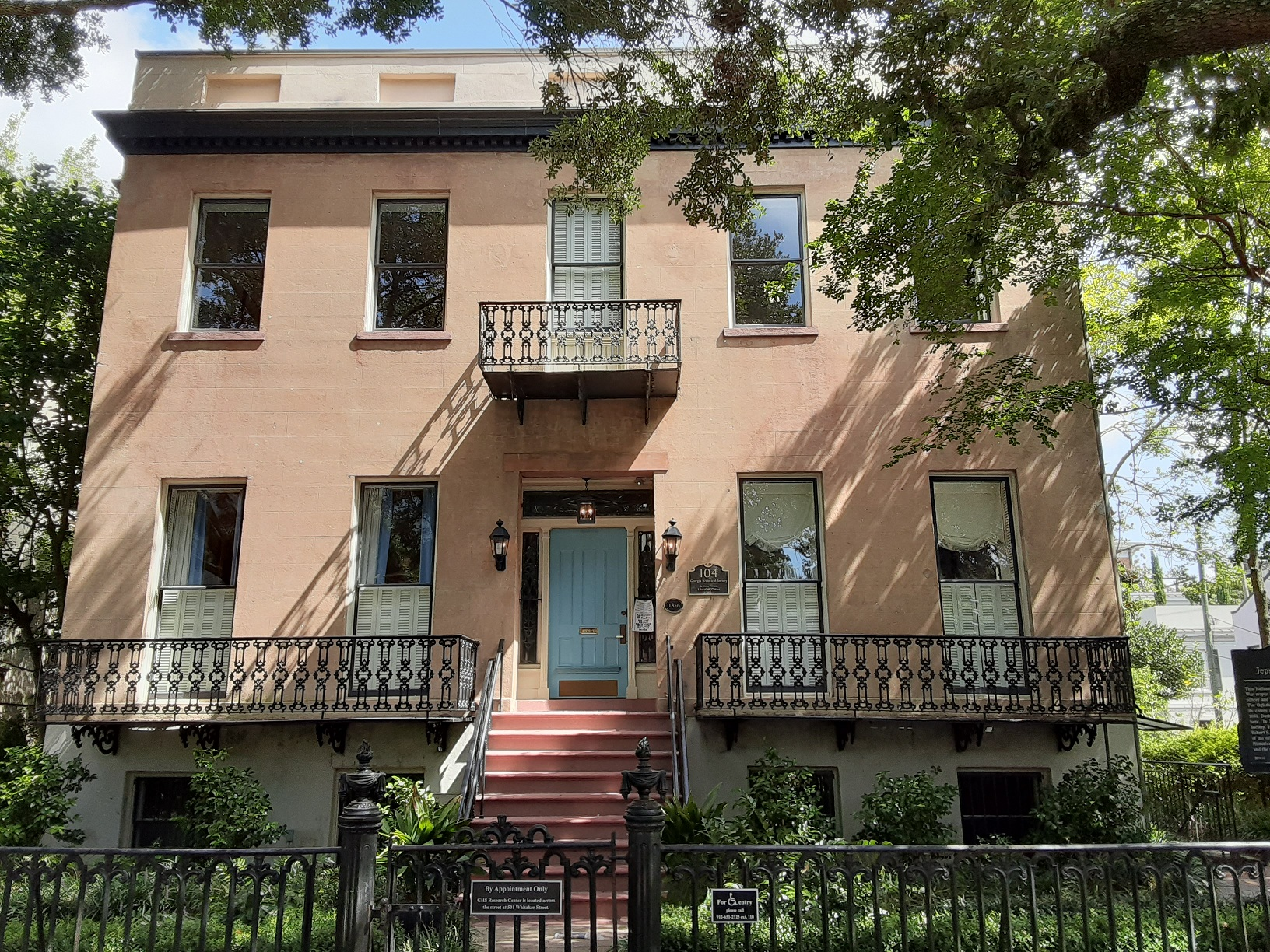
Thomas Holcombe House, 104 West Gaston Street

Below is a selection of notable buildings and structures on Gaston Street, all in Savannah's Historic District. From west to east:

West Gaston Street

- John Heitman Property, 214–218 West Gaston Street (1879–1883)
- John Muller (Estate of) Property, 209–211 West Gaston Street (1870)
- Elizabeth Russell Property, 208–210 West Gaston Street (1855)
- Israel Dasher House, 124 West Gaston Street (1858)
- Gustavus Holcombe Property, 116–118 West Gaston Street (1852)
- Blun–Meyer Row, 115–125 West Gaston Street (1870–1871)
- Henry Blun Property, 113 West Gaston Street (501 Howard Street) (1870–1871)
- George Cubbedge Property, 112–114 West Gaston Street (1853)
- Nathan Brown House, 110 West Gaston Street (1874)
- Thomas Holcombe House, 104 West Gaston Street (1856)
- George Gray House (Gray–Minis House), 24 West Gaston Street (1862)
- William F. Brantley House, 20 West Gaston Street (1857)

East Gaston Street

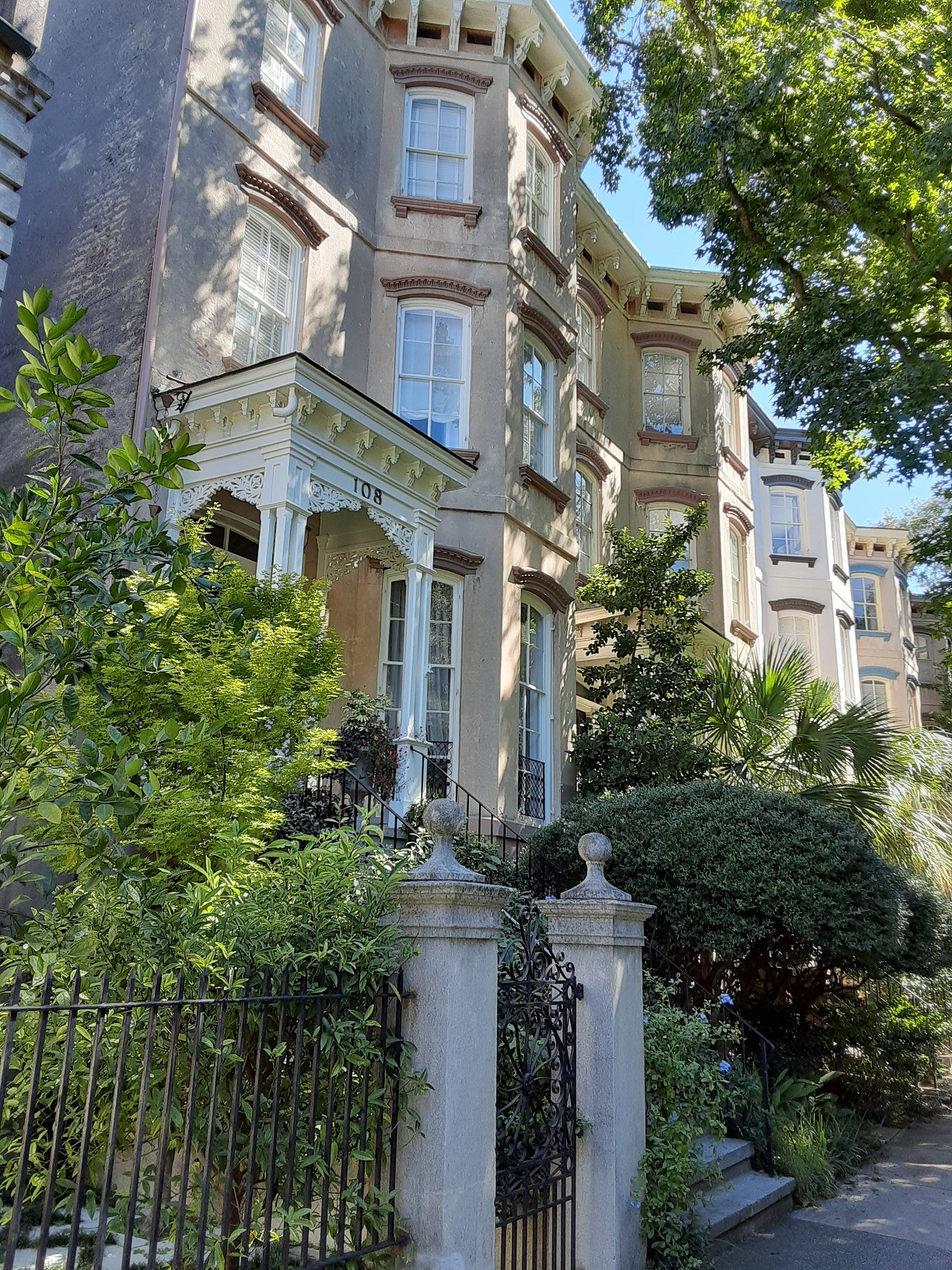
J. J. Dale & David Wells Row House, 108–116 East Gaston Street

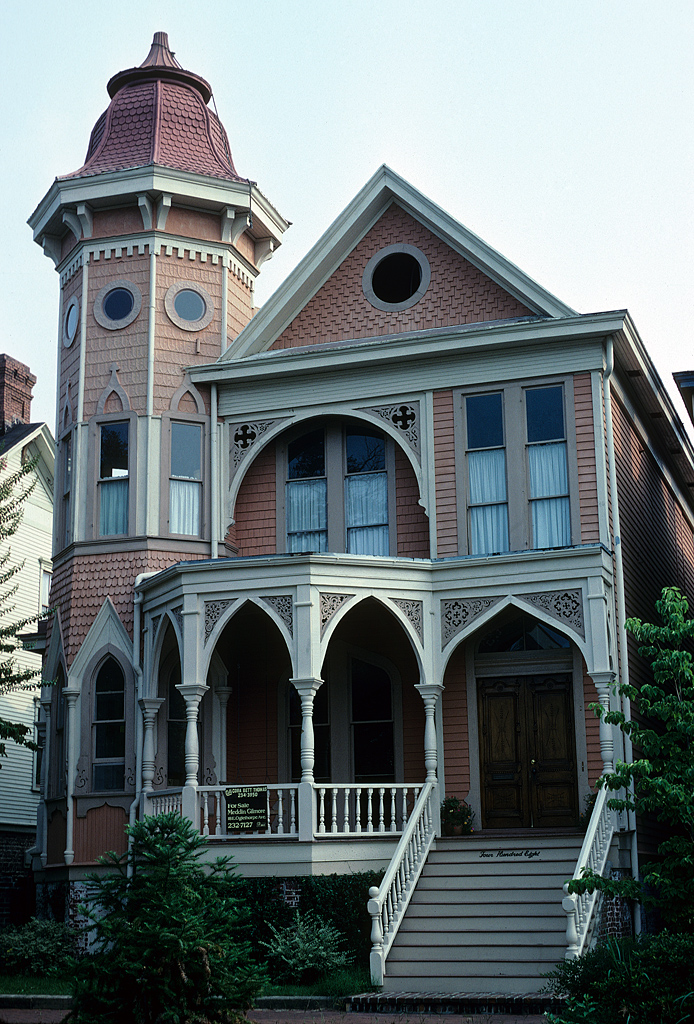
Laura Jones House, 408 East Gaston Street

- Mills B. Lane House, 26 East Gaston Street (1909)
- Mary C. Lane House, 102 East Gaston Street (1927) – a replica of The Olde Pink House
- J. J. Dale & David Wells Row House, 108–116 East Gaston Street (1884)
- William Wade House, 120 East Gaston Street (1883)
- Granite Hall, 126 East Gaston Street (1881)
- Gilbert Watkins House, 201 East Gaston Street (1869)
- Algernon Hartridge Row House, 202–206 East Gaston Street (1868)
- William Boyd House, 205 East Gaston Street (1868)
- Abraham Smith & Herman Traub Duplex, 208–210 East Gaston Street (1891)
- Dresser–Palmer House, 211 East Gaston Street (c. 1876)
- Fred & Darwin Dull Duplex, 212–214 East Gaston Street (1869)
- Dale Row, 213–221 East Gaston Street (1877)
- Aaron Champion & George Freeman Duplex, 216–218 East Gaston Street (1870)
- Robert Footman House, 220 East Gaston Street (1869) – now the Gastonian Inn
- Donald McDonald House, 303 East Gaston Street (1867)
- John Hopkins Property (I), 304 East Gaston Street (1867)
- John Hopkins Property (II), 308–310 East Gaston Street (1890)
- Hibernia McDonough House, 314–316 East Gaston Street (1883)
- Harriet Neufville House, 318 East Gaston Street (1887)
- Tomlinson Johnson House, 402–404 East Gaston Street (1888)
- John Entelman Property, 405–407 East Gaston Street (1892)
- Laura Jones House, 408 East Gaston Street (1892)
- Solomon Cohen Row House, 409–417 East Gaston Street (1890)
- William Bohan Property (I), 410 East Gaston Street (1891)
- William Bohan Property (II), 412 East Gaston Street (1891)
- Josephine Rogers House, 519 East Gaston Street (1889)
- York Milledge House, 521 East Gaston Street (1891)
- John Starr House, 523 East Gaston Street (1892)
- James Rogers Property, 525–527 East Gaston Street (1896)
- 536–538 East Gaston Street (1899)
- 540–542 East Gaston Street (1907)
- 544–546 East Gaston Street (1907)
