= John Drayton House =

Coordinates: 32.772721°N 79.931227°W

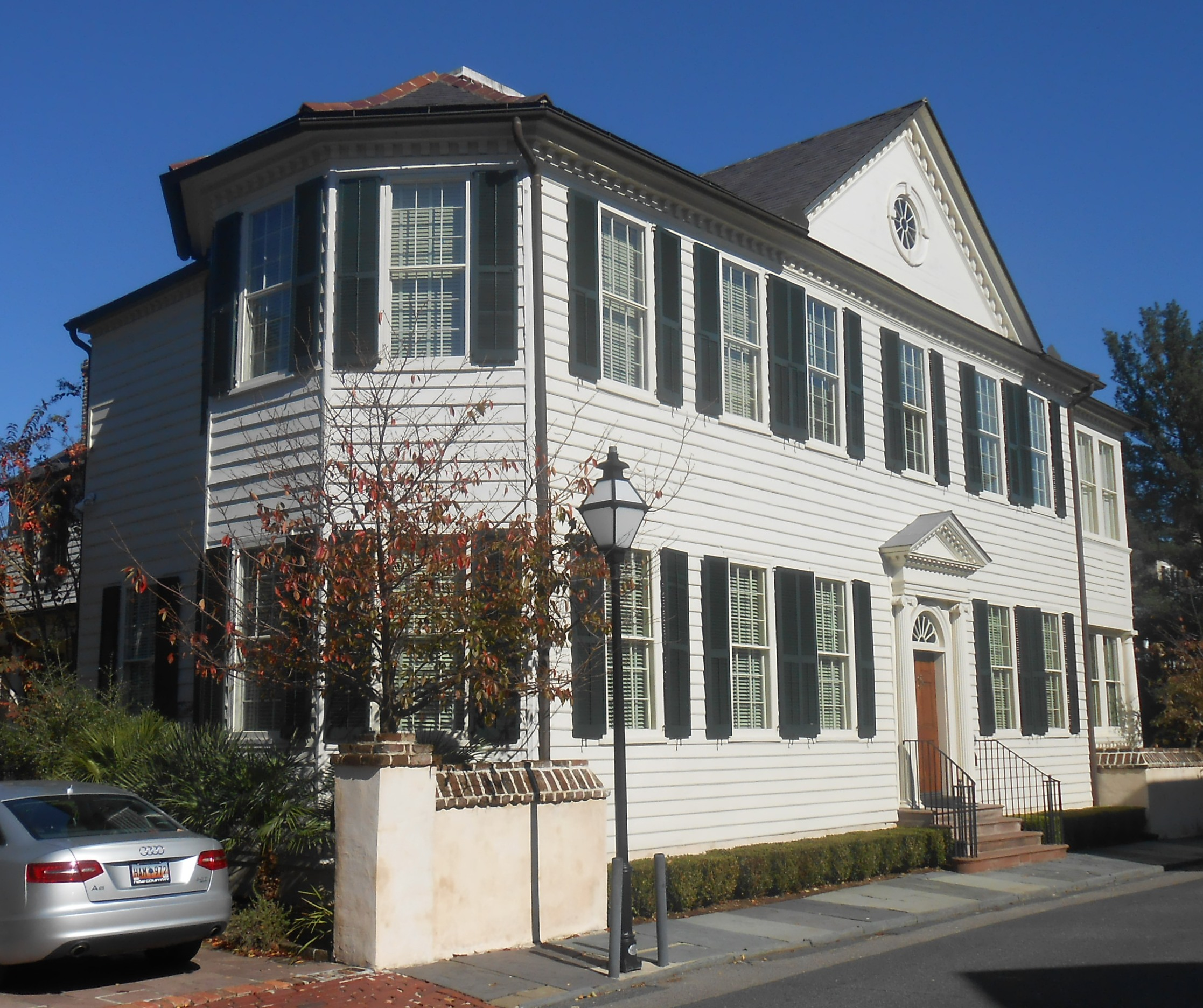
The John Drayton House is at 2 Ladson Street.

The John Drayton House is a two-story wooden residence constructed on property that had been given by the state's first lieutenant governor, William Bull, to his son-in-law, John Drayton. The house was built, probably by John Drayton (the builder of Drayton Hall plantation), some time after 1746 with alterations made in about 1813 and again in about 1900. Over time, the house has been attributed to different owners; during most of the 20th century, the house was credited to James Shoolbred, the first British consul in Charleston, with a construction date of about 1793.
