= The Gaston Tomb =

Tomb located in Savannah, Georgia

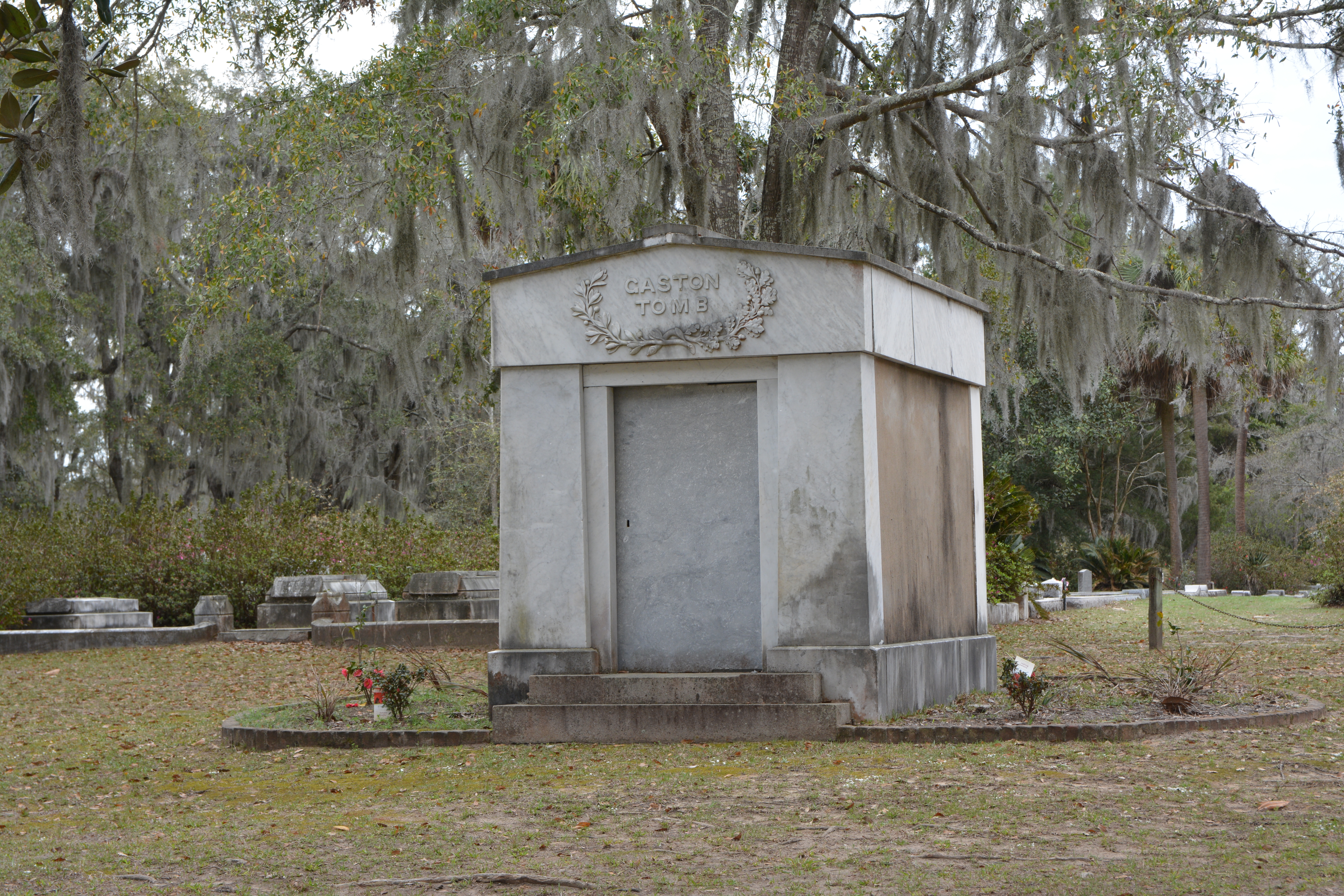
- The tomb pictured in 2018
- Interactive map of The Gaston Tomb
- Location: Bonaventure Cemetery, Savannah, Georgia, U.S.
- Coordinates: 32.04511°N 81.04999°W
- Material: Marble
- Completion date: 1844 (182 years ago)
- Dedicated to: William Gaston

The Gaston Tomb (also known as the Stranger's Tomb) is a tomb in Bonaventure Cemetery, Savannah, Georgia. It was built in memory of William Gaston, a prominent merchant in Savannah who died in 1837. The tomb was built seven years later, initially in Savannah's Colonial Park Cemetery. It was moved to Bonaventure in 1873.

Standing immediately inside the cemetery's gates, one of the tomb's vaults was used as a temporary resting place for visitors to Savannah who died while in the city. It allowed time for the relatives of the deceased to make arrangements for their burial.

Gaston, nicknamed The Perfect Host, was initially interred in New York Marble Cemetery in Manhattan, but was later removed to the tomb at the request of William Ker, Gaston's nephew.
