= Drayton Hall =

Historic house in South Carolina, United States

- U.S. National Register of Historic Places
- U.S. National Historic Landmark
- U.S. Historic district – Contributing property
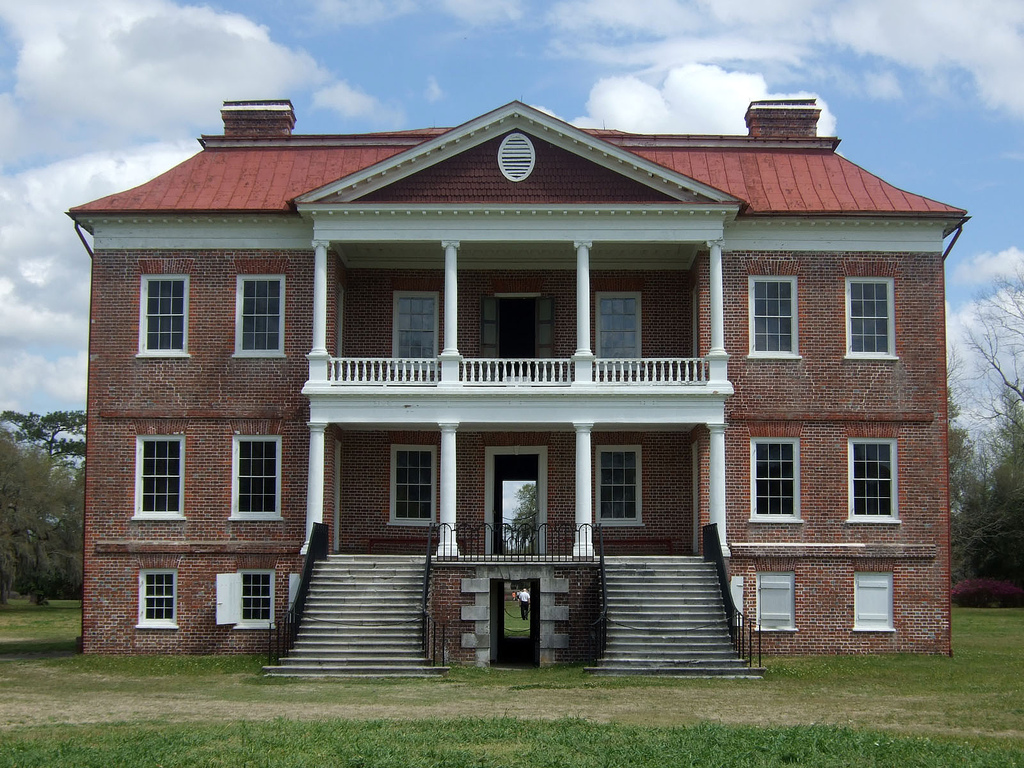
- Drayton Hall (front)
- Nearest city: Charleston, South Carolina and North Charleston, South Carolina
- Coordinates: 32°52′15.24″N 80°4′34.68″W
- Built: 1747–1752
- Architectural style: Palladian
- NRHP reference No.: 66000701

Significant dates
- Added to NRHP: October 15, 1966
- Designated NHL: October 9, 1960

Drayton Hall is an 18th-century plantation house located on the Ashley River about 15 miles (24 km) northwest of Charleston, South Carolina, and directly across the Ashley River from North Charleston, west of the Ashley in the Lowcountry. An example of Palladian architecture in North America and the only plantation house on the Ashley River to survive intact through both the Revolutionary and Civil wars, it is a National Historic Landmark.

== Description ==
The house has a double projecting portico on the west facade, which faces away from the river and toward the land side approach from Ashley River Road. The portico resembles a similar feature at the Villa Cornaro near Venice, Italy, designed by Andrea Palladio in 1551. However, the most direct Palladian correlate to Drayton Hall is Villa Pisani.

The floor plan is Palladian-inspired as well, perhaps derived from Plate 38 of James Gibbs' A Book of Architecture, the influential pattern book published in London in 1728. A large central entrance stair hall with a symmetrical divided staircase is backed by a large salon, flanked by square and rectangular chambers. Pedimented chimney-pieces in the house echo designs of Inigo Jones.

== History ==
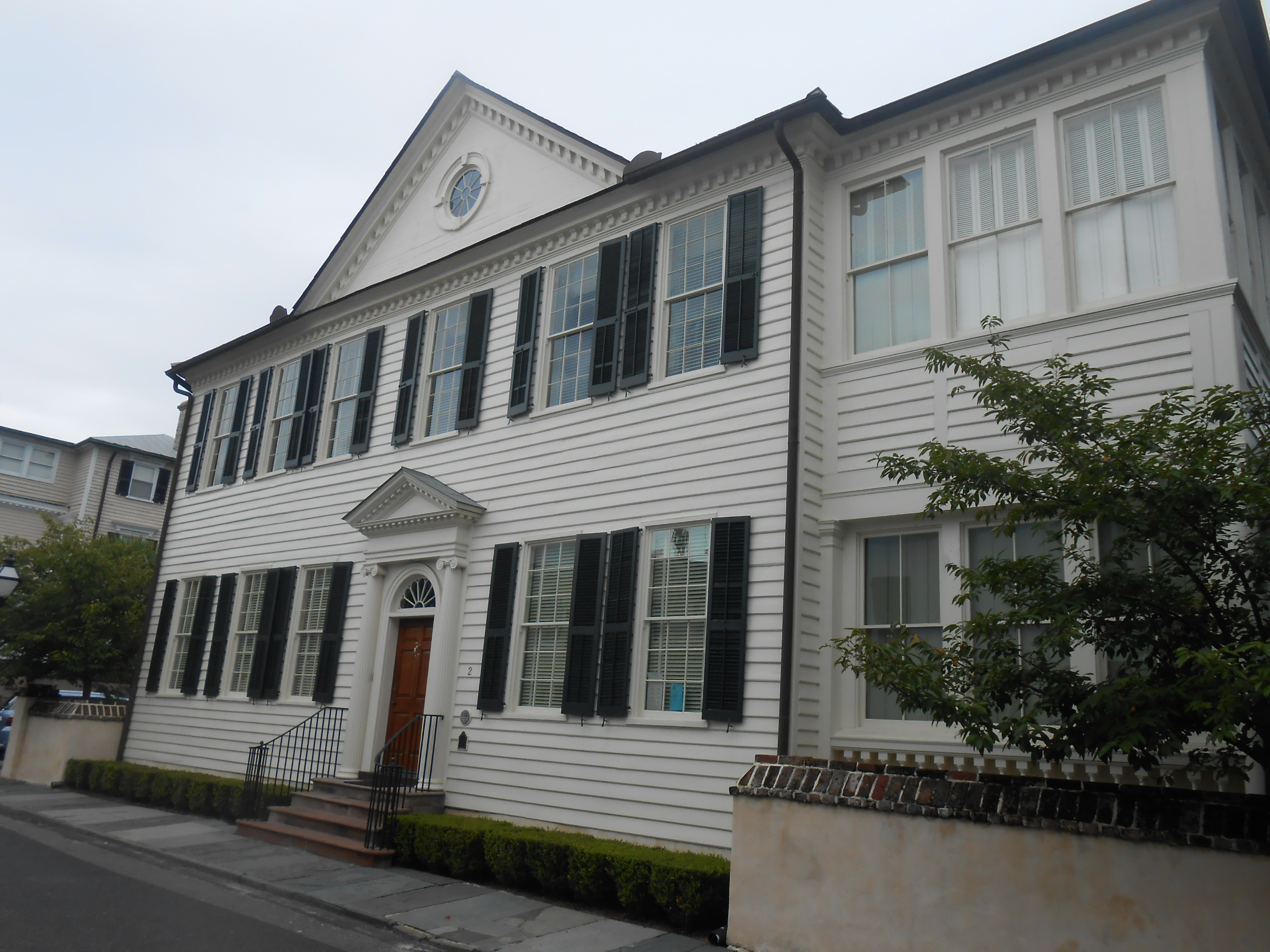
The John Drayton House at 2 Ladson St. in downtown Charleston, South Carolina was built after 1746 by John Drayton, the builder of Drayton Hall, and shows his preference for the Georgian Palladian style.

The mansion was built for the grandfather of John Drayton, John Drayton Sr. (c. 1715–1779; son of Thomas and Ann Drayton) after he bought the property in 1738.

For many decades, the house was thought to have been begun in 1738 and completed in 1752. In 2014, an examination of wood cores showed that the attic timbers were cut from trees felled in the winter of 1747–48. Because the attic framing would have to have been in place well before the completion of the interior finishes, the house is thought to have been occupied by the early 1750s. The seven-bay, double-pile plantation house is within a 630-acre (2.5 km^{2}) site that is part of the plantation based on indigo and rice and the former site of 13 slave cabins believed to have housed approximately 78 slaves. Seven generations of Drayton heirs preserved the house, though the flanking outbuildings have not survived: an earthquake destroyed the laundry house in 1886, and a hurricane destroyed the kitchen in 1893.

The house is located in the Ashley River Historic District, it was declared a National Historic Landmark in 1960.

== Gallery ==
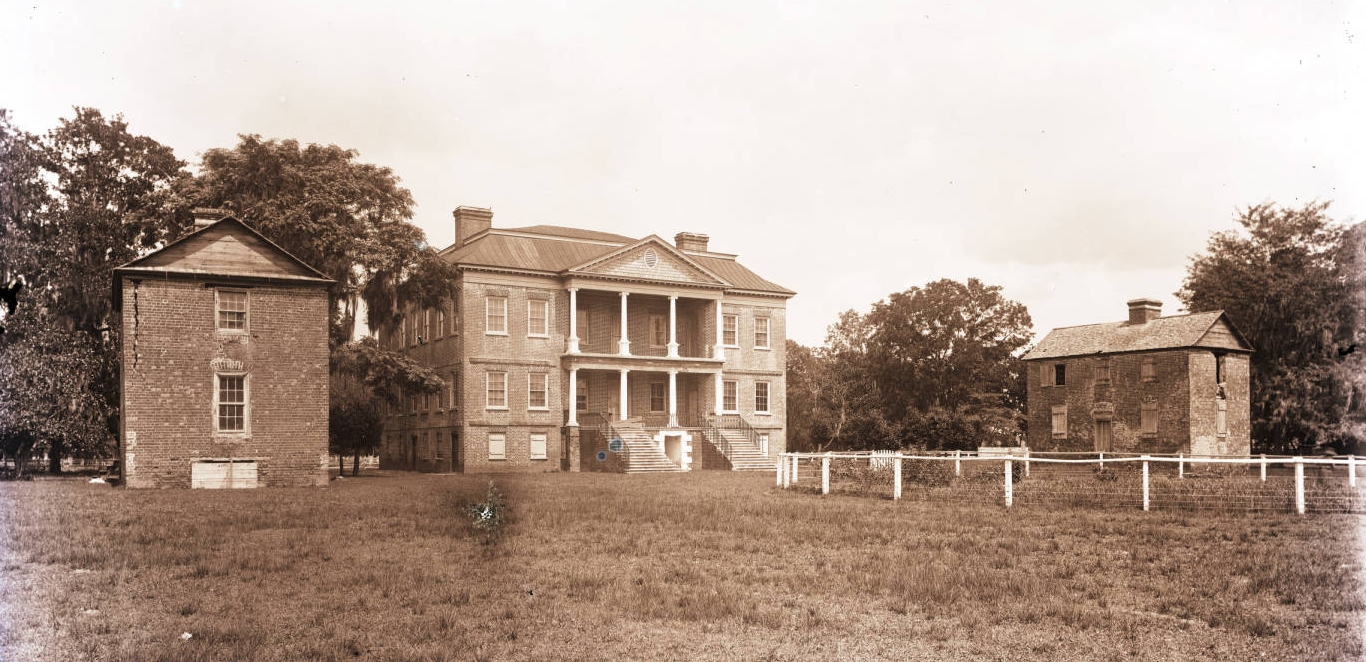
When photographed by George LaGrange Cook in about 1890, Drayton Hall's two flanker buildings were still extant.

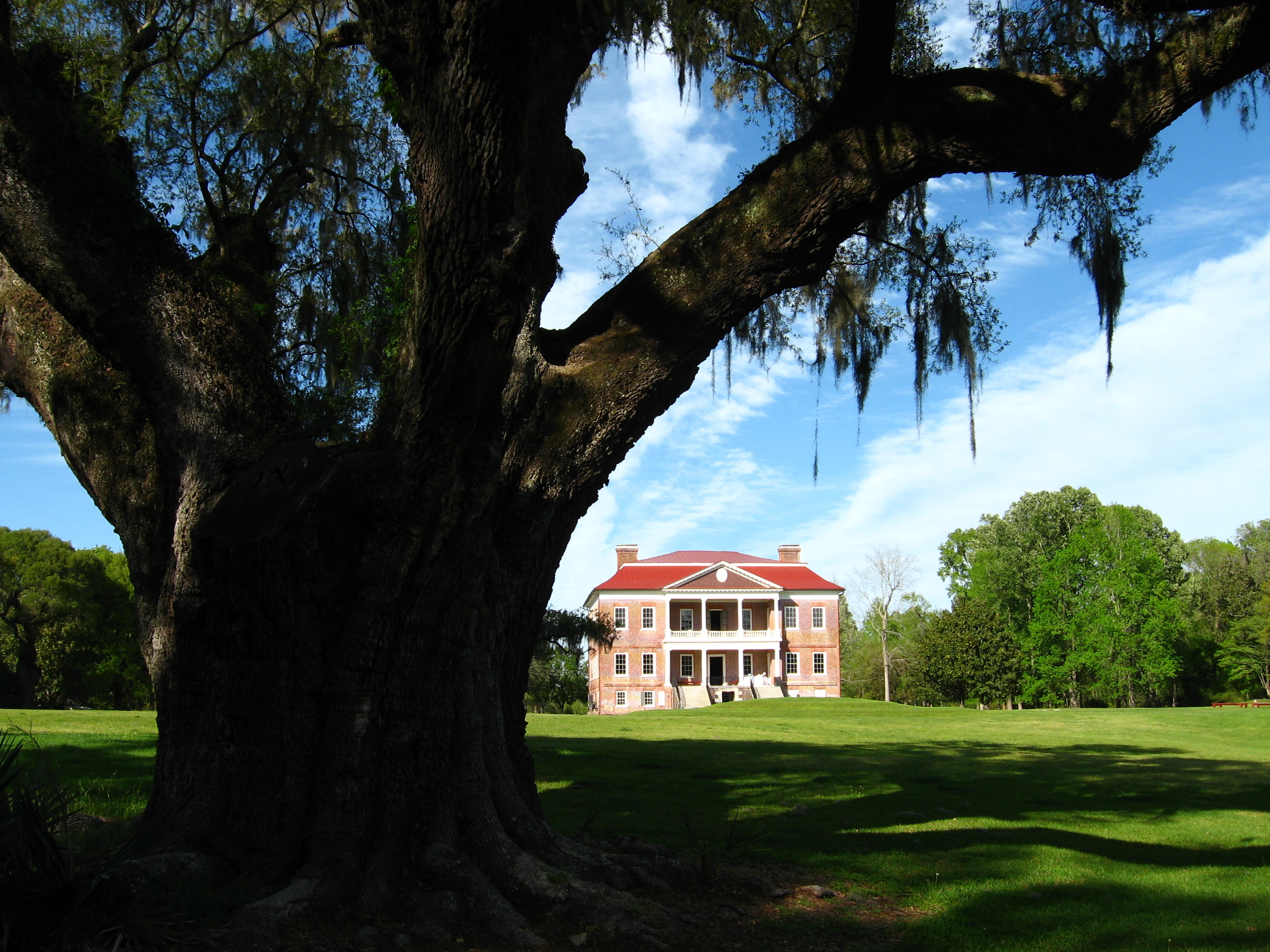
Drayton Hall plantation house viewed from behind one of several live oaks.

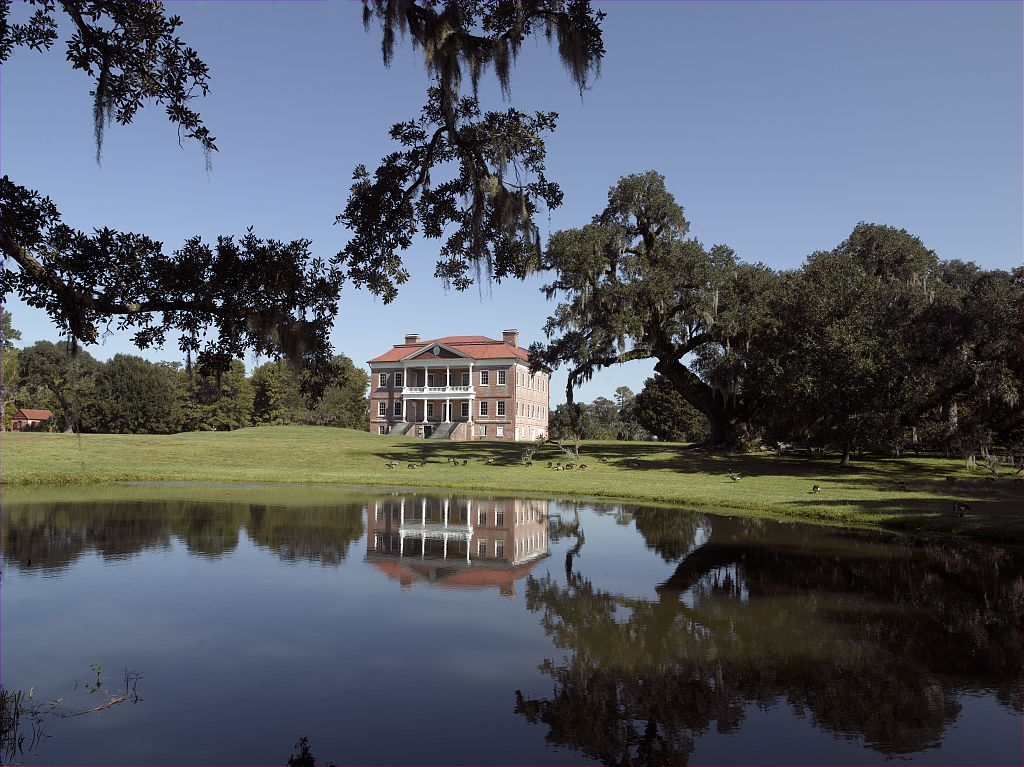
Drayton Hall plantation house by Carol M. Highsmith.

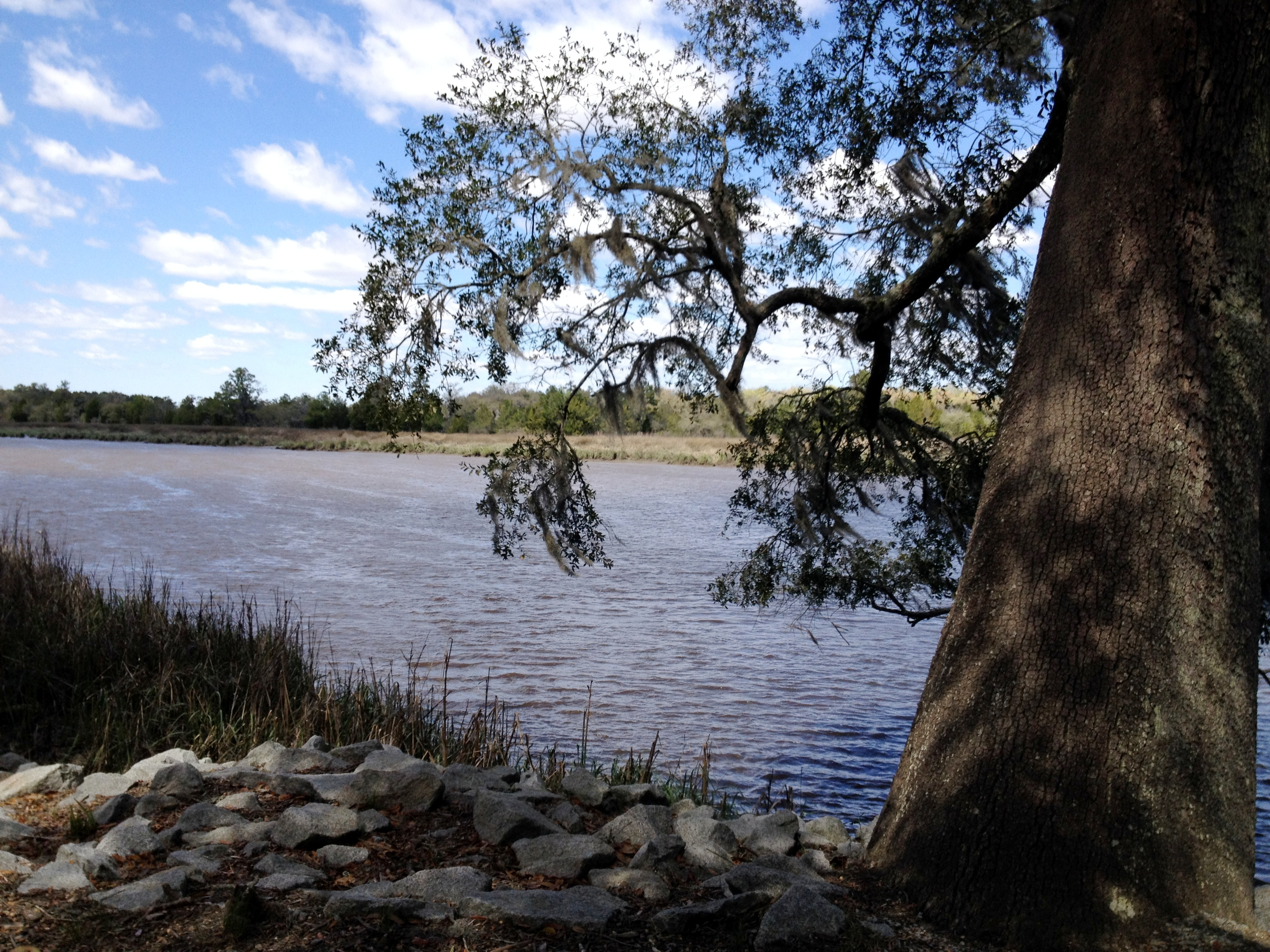
The Ashley river, just behind Drayton Hall

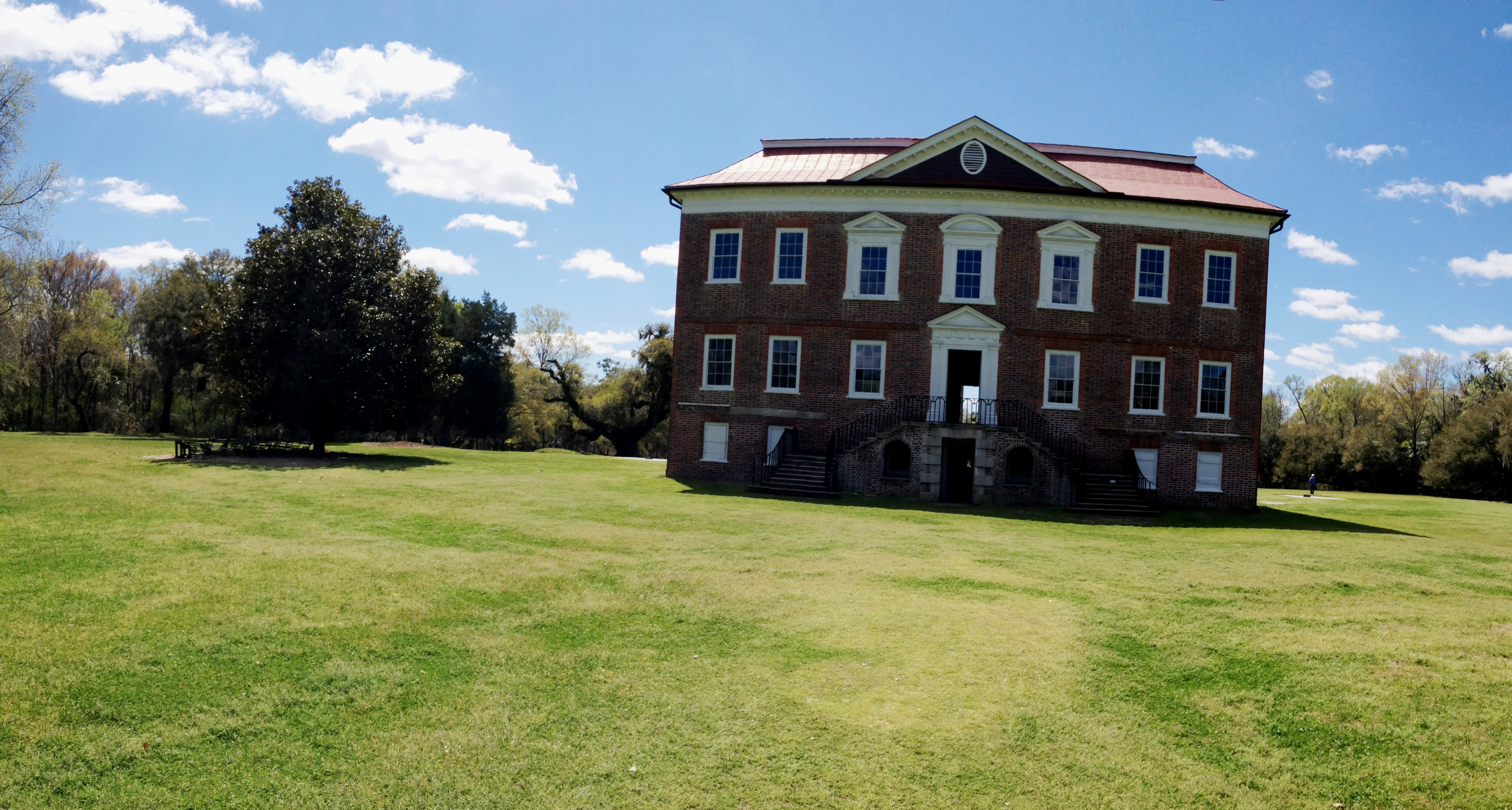
Rear view of Drayton Hall

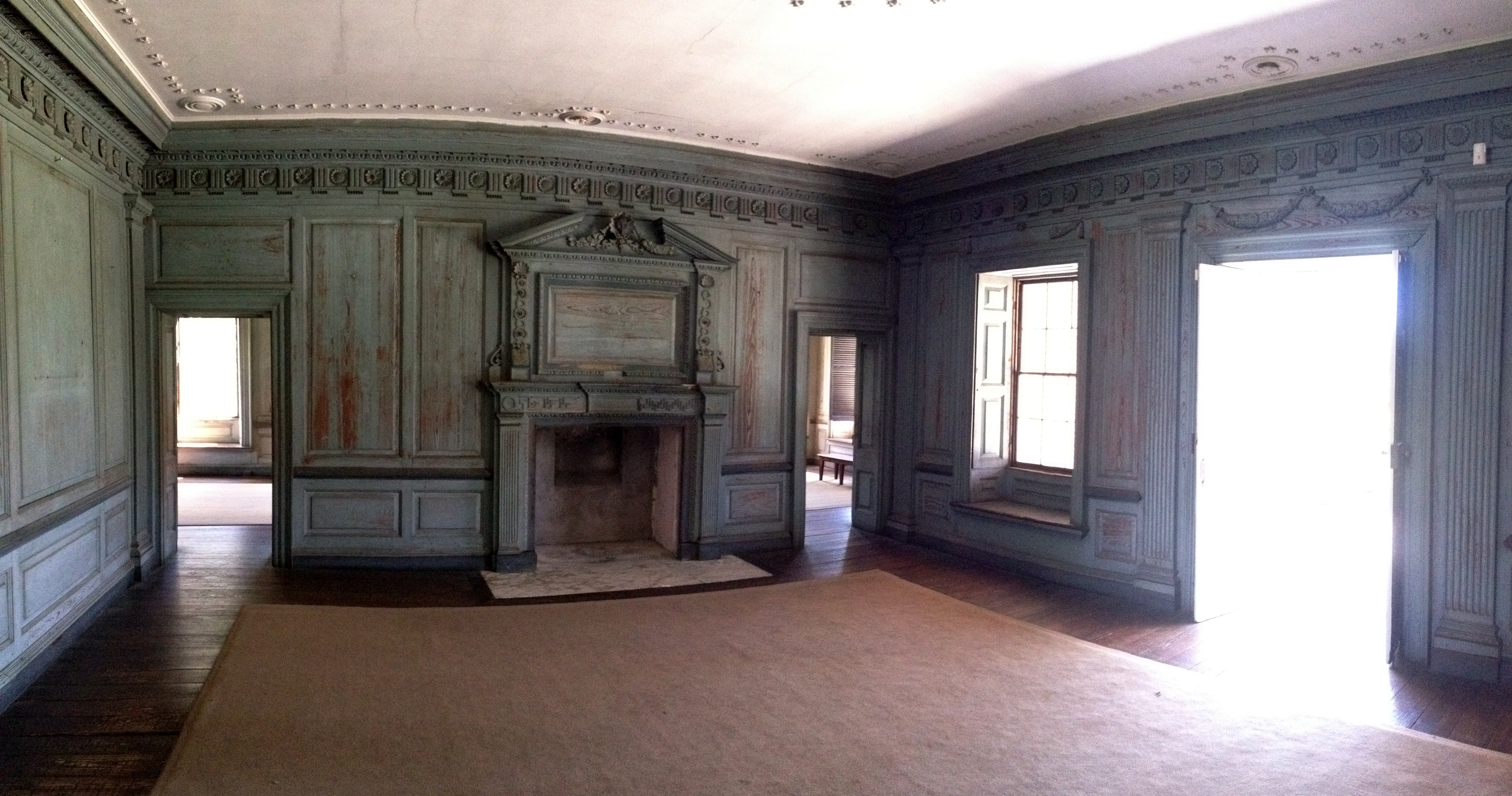
Main living space at Drayton Hall

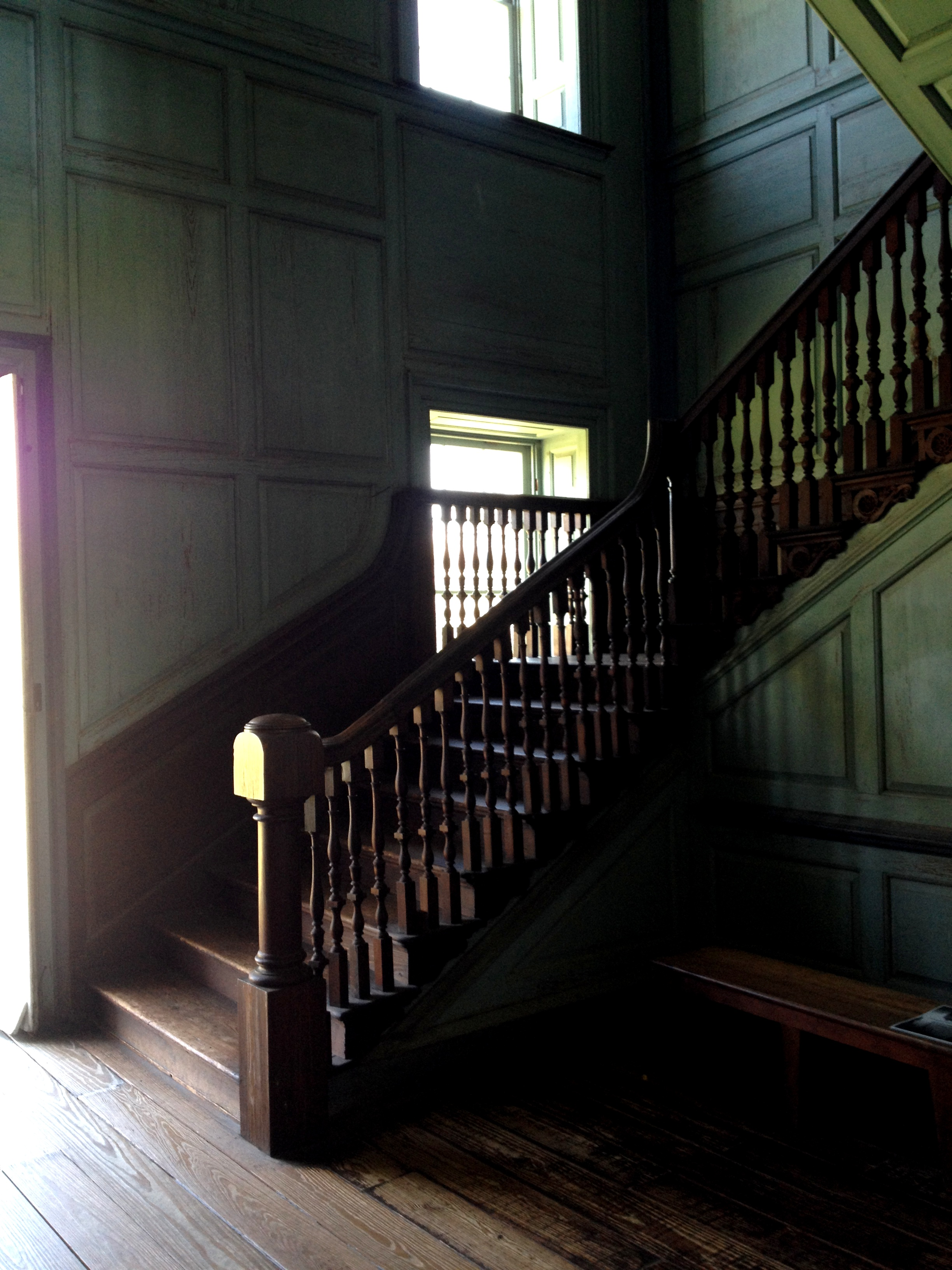
Drayton Hall staircase

== See also ==
- List of the oldest buildings in South Carolina
- List of National Historic Landmarks in South Carolina
- National Register of Historic Places listings in Charleston, South Carolina
