= William Gaston (merchant) =

Merchant in Savannah, Georgia, US (1785–1837)

- Born: September 26, 1785; Somerset County, New Jersey, U.S.
- Died: September 12, 1837 (aged 52); New York City, New York, U.S.
- Resting place: Bonaventure Cemetery, Savannah, Georgia, U.S.
- Occupation: merchant
- Parent(s): William Gaston; Naomi Teeple

William Gaston (September 26, 1785 – September 12, 1837) was a merchant in Savannah, Georgia, where Gaston Street is named for him, as is The Gaston Tomb in Bonaventure Cemetery.

== Early life and career ==
Gaston was born in 1785 in Somerset County, New Jersey, to William Gaston Sr. and Naomi Teeple.

Early in his life he was engaged to a young lady from Morristown, New Jersey. "He left New York, full of love and anticipations of happiness, to fulfil his engagement, when he found the object of his affection dangerously ill," wrote Gaston's friend Philip Hone in his published diary. She died shortly afterwards. Affected greatly by his loss, Gaston lived the rest of his life as a bachelor.

He moved to Savannah, Georgia, where, in November 1805, he established himself as a cotton merchant. He had a branch office in New York City, where he was assisted by his nephew, William Ker Gaston (1806–1885). He went on to live in a now-demolished "stately old mansion" at the northeastern corner of Broughton Street and Habersham Street. He also had a cottage on Long Island, New York, at the Narrows, near Fort Hamilton.

== Death and legacy ==
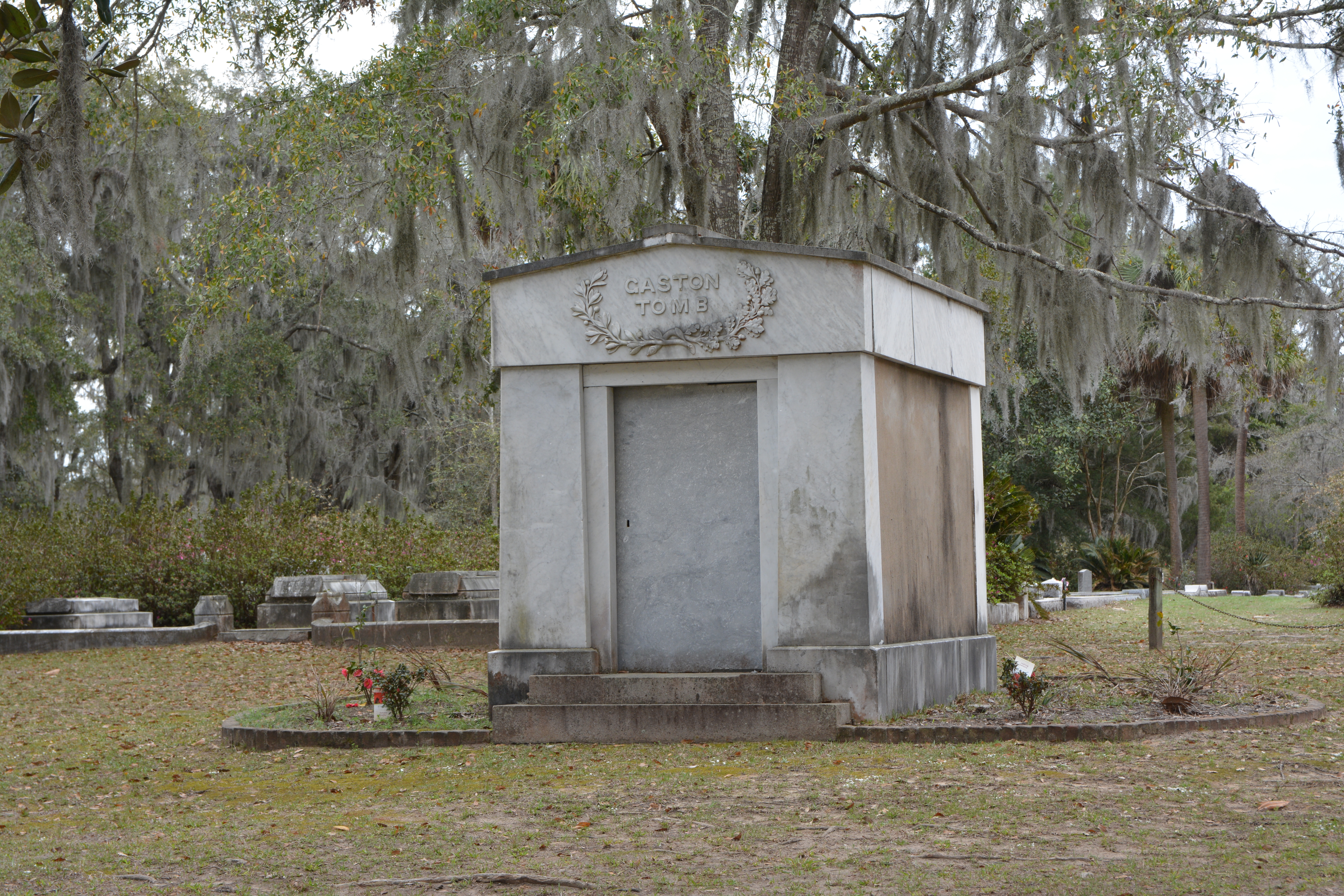
The Gaston Tomb, Bonaventure Cemetery

Gaston, nicknamed The Perfect Host, died in 1837 while in New York City, and in the presence of his nephew. He was 52. He was described as "an upright merchant, an accomplished gentleman, a benevolent man." He was originally interred in the New York Marble Cemetery in Manhattan, but was later moved, at the request of William Ker, to Savannah's Bonaventure Cemetery. The Gaston Tomb, also known as the "Stranger's Tomb", because it provided a temporary place of rest for visitors who died while in Savannah, was originally constructed in Colonial Park Cemetery in 1844.

Gaston Street in Savannah is named for him.
