= W. B. Hodgson Hall =

- U.S. National Register of Historic Places
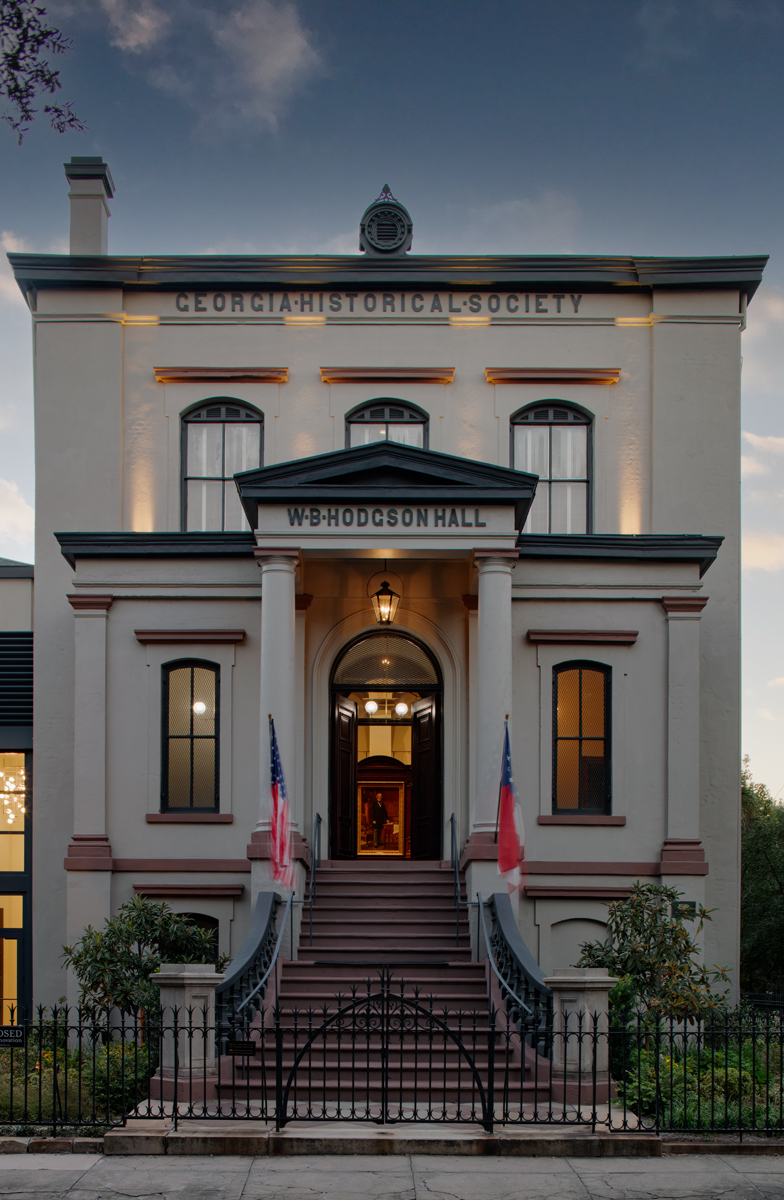
- The Georgia Historical Society's Hodgson Hall in 2022
- Location: 501 Whitaker Street, Savannah, Georgia
- Coordinates: 32°04′14″N 81°05′48″W
- Built: 1876; 150 years ago
- Architect: Detlef Lienau
- Part of: Savannah Historic District
- NRHP reference No.: 77000413
- Added to NRHP: March 25, 1977

W. B. Hodgson Hall is a historic building in Savannah, Georgia, United States, built in 1876. Designed by the American Institute of Architects' founder Detlef Lienau, it is now the home of Georgia Historical Society's Research Center.

The building is located at 501 Whitaker Street, in the northwestern corner of Forsyth Park.

== William B. Hodgson ==
The building was a gift of Margaret Telfair Hodgson and her sister, Mary Telfair (see Telfair Academy), as a memorial to Margaret's husband, William Brown Hodgson (1801–1871), a prominent Savannah citizen, American diplomat and scholar of the Middle East. Hodgson died on June 26, 1871, while on a visit to New York City.

Hodgson was a member of the Georgia Historical Society, and one of its curators for 25 years.

Hodgson is buried in Savannah's Bonaventure Cemetery. Although he arranged with (and paid) William H. Wiltberger for burial in lot 13 of section D, he was interred in lot 19 of the same section. The family of Noble Jones, including his son Noble Wimberly Jones, occupies lot 13.
