= Ann Drayton =

American landowner

- Born: Ann Fox c. 1678
- Died: 1742
- Occupation: landowner
- Spouse: Thomas Drayton (c. 1698–1721; his death)

Ann Fox Drayton (c. 1678–1742) was an American landowner, prominent in the American South during the early 18th century. Along with her relatives Rebecca and Charlotte, she became known as one of the women of Drayton Hall, which her youngest son, John (1716–1779), built. Drayton Street in Savannah, Georgia, is named for her.

== Life and career ==
Ann Fox was born in the second half of the 17th century. Around 1698, she married Thomas Drayton, who regarded Ann's father, Stephen, as a mentor. Ann was Thomas' second wife. After arriving from Barbados in 1678, they were bequeathed today's Magnolia Plantation in Charleston, South Carolina, by Ann's father around 1704.

She became a widowed mother when Thomas died in 1721 at the age of 71. Her children were Mary (born 1704; married colonel Thomas Fuller), Thomas (born 1710), Stephen Fox (1713 or 1714) and John (1716). Choosing not to remarry, she began to establish herself alongside the male planter elite in South Carolina.

After her husband's death, she served as the manager of the family estate, and had extensively increased its properties by the time of her death.

In 1730, Thomas Jr. married Elizabeth Bull, daughter of William Bull, who assisted general James Edward Oglethorpe in the laying out of Savannah, Province of Georgia, three years later. In 1737, Bull became the 24th governor of South Carolina.

Drayton's son, Stephen, died in 1733, shortly before his 21st birthday.

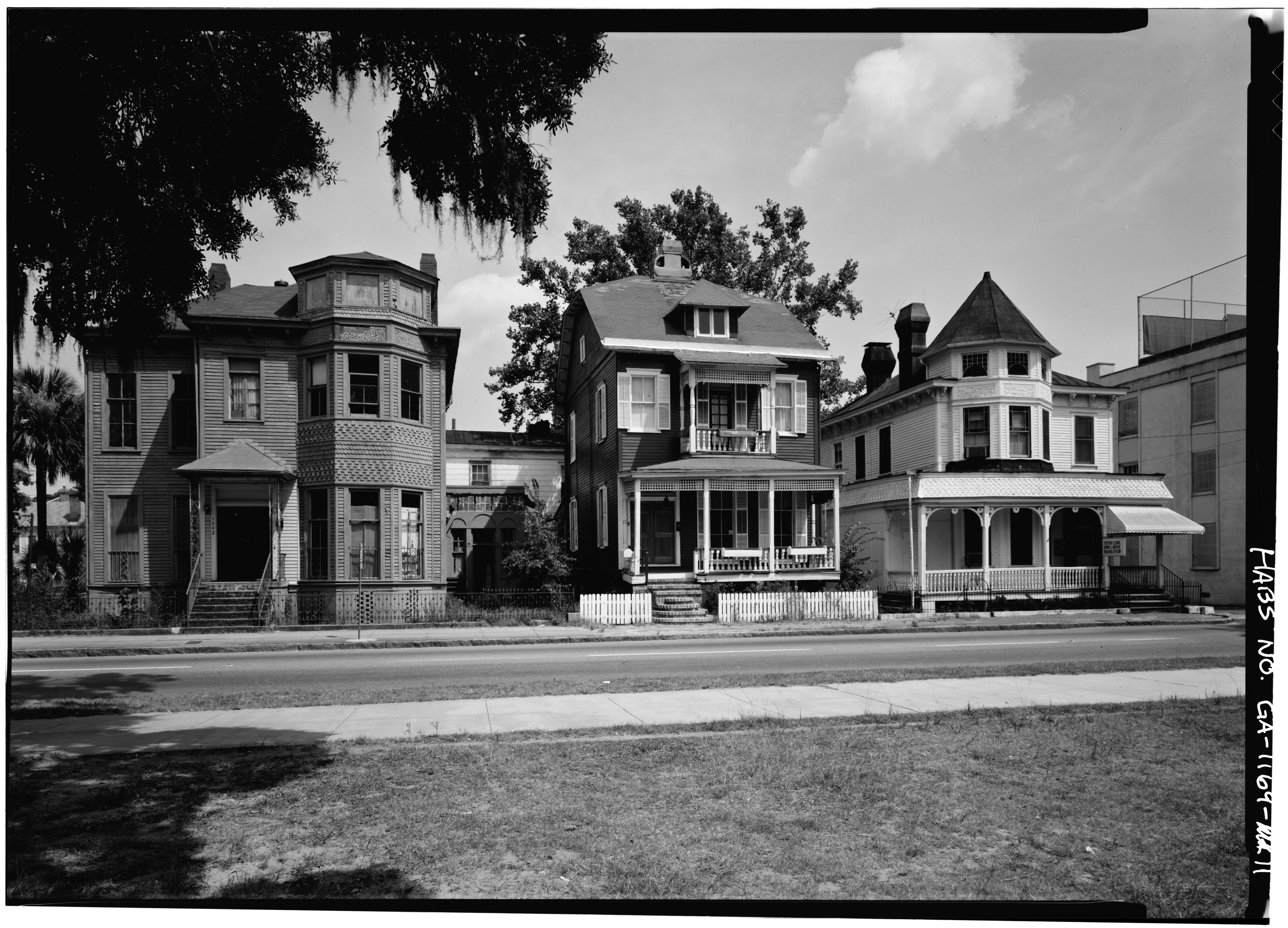
Homes on Drayton Street, in Savannah, Georgia, which was named for her

=== Death ===
Drayton died in 1742. Having possessed a deep distrust of her son-in-law Thomas Fuller, she left an "estate in trust" to her daughter Mary, stipulating that Fuller would have nothing at all to do with any part of her daughter's inheritance.

As a legacy, Drayton Street, in Savannah, Georgia, was named in her honor, after she had lent four sawyers to assist colonists in building one of the first homes in the city.
