= Benjamin Whitaker (surveyor general) =

Benjamin Whitaker was surveyor general for the Province of South Carolina. He was initially deputy surveyor (under James St. John), but rose to attorney general (1721–1731), judge of the court of vice-admiralty (1727–1732 and 1732–1736), speaker of the assembly (1742–1744) and chief justice (1739–1749). He was removed from the role of chief justice for "being paralytic".

He was regarded as one of the best lawyers of his time.

Whitaker Street in Savannah, Georgia, is now named for him.

== Personal life ==
On May 20, 1719, Whitaker married Sarah Godfrey, daughter of Captain John Godfrey. She died on December 29, 1747, and was interred in St. Philip's Church Episcopal Cemetery in Charleston, South Carolina.
