= Forsyth Park =

Public park in Savannah, Georgia

Coordinates: 32.0676°N 81.0963°W

- Military Parade Ground (formerly)
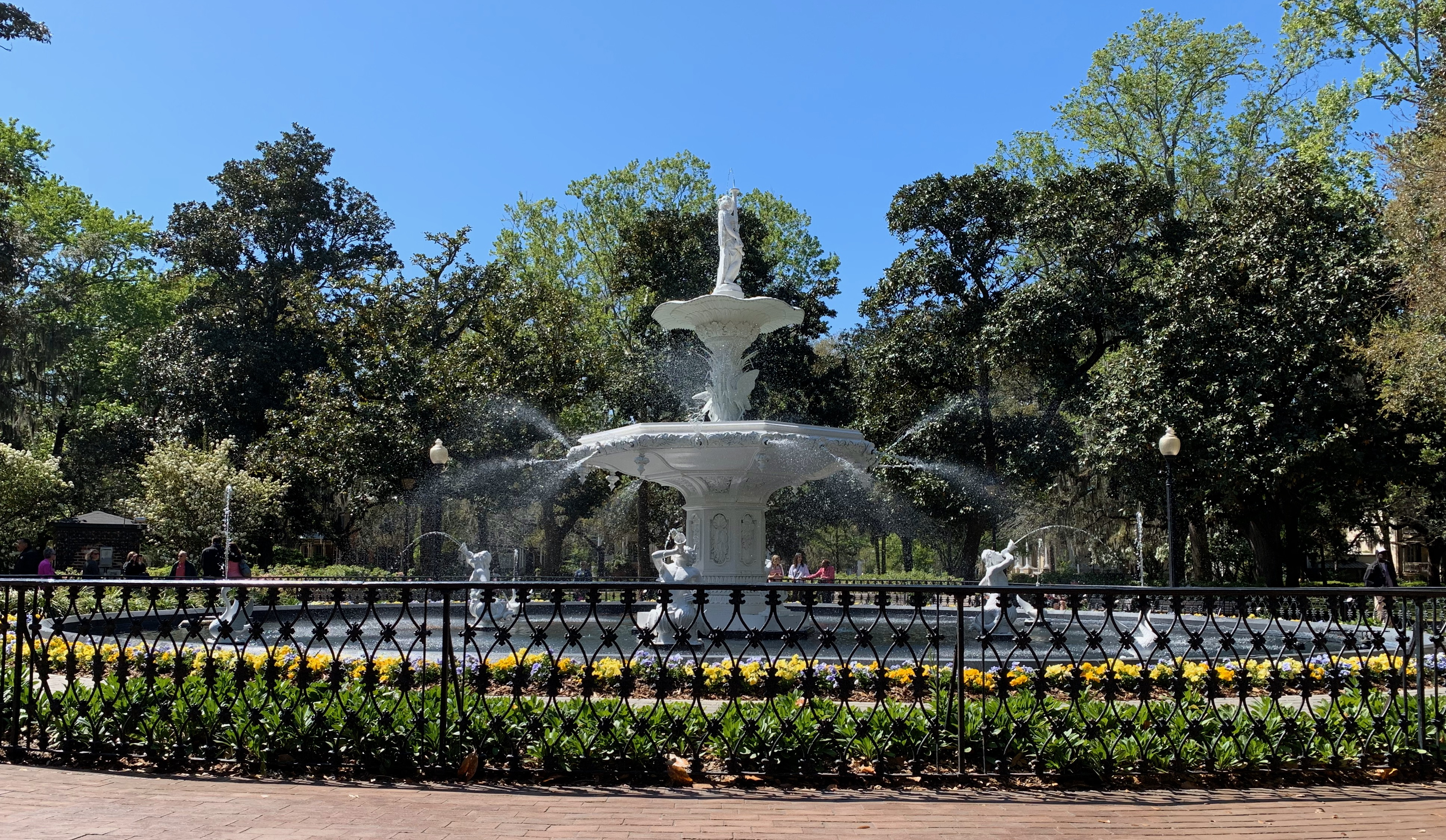
- Forsyth fountain in Forsyth Park
- Interactive map of Forsyth Park
- Type: Public park
- Location: Savannah, Georgia, U.S.
- Area: 30 acres (0.12 km^{2})
- Created: 1840s
- Operator: City of Savannah
- Open: All year
- Forsyth Park
- U.S. National Historic Landmark District – Contributing property
- Part of: Savannah Historic District (ID66000277)
- Added to NRHP: 1966-11-13

Forsyth Park (formerly known as Forsyth Place and Ward and the Military Parade Ground) is a large city park that occupies 30 acres (0.12 km^{2}) in the Savannah Historic District of Savannah, Georgia, United States. The park is bordered by Gaston Street to the north, Drayton Street to the east, Park Avenue to the south and Whitaker Street to the west. It contains walking paths, a children's play area, a Fragrant Garden for the blind, a large fountain, tennis courts, basketball courts, areas for soccer and Frisbee, and home field for Savannah Shamrocks Rugby Club. From time to time, there are concerts held at Forsyth to the benefit of the public.

== Development ==
The park was originally created in the 1840s on 10 acres (0.04 km^{2}) of land donated by William Brown Hodgson. In 1851, the park was expanded and named for Georgia Governor John Forsyth. By 1853, all original planned wards of Savannah were occupied. A large 18.9 acre Parade Ground was added south end of the park and sold to the Military Captains Association officially in 1859. Two ordinances, one in 1914 and the other in 1923, affirm this. The owners granted that the city use the land for public enjoyment, in exchange for property tax exemption and general maintenance and security of the land in perpetuity. This park was anticipated by General James Oglethorpe's plan and was made possible by a donation of 20 acres (81,000 m^{2}) of land owned by Forsyth.

Regarding the Southern Extension Chain of Ownership:

On August 11, 1853, the Mayor and Aldermen of Savannah adopted an ordinance dedicating as a Military Parade Ground that portion of the 'Old Cantonment Area' with borders of Park, Montgomery, Gwinnett, Whitaker "that the control, custody, and management of the said Parade Ground shall be vested in the Captains for the time being, of the several Volunteer Companies of the City of Savannah, who shall have exclusive charge thereof, subject to Savannah police regulations.

Forsyth Park north entrance

On November 10, 1859 by an Act of Council of the City of Savannah, following an agreement with the Military Commanders, that property, the Military Parade Ground, formerly a part of the Old Cantonment, was exchanged for the trace of land, 18.9 acres known as the (southern Forsyth) Park Extension. The Committee on Sales and Public Lots was given power to set with regard to the land obtained for the Military and in their reports to Council they recited that the City had profited by the exchange and from the sale of the subdivided lots to the extent of many thousands of dollars and that the Military of Savannah now possessed a "handsome, permanent, and attractive Parade Ground wherein Company and Regimental drills may at all times be had, the reference being to the present Parade Ground, Forsyth Park Extension." The former Military Parade Ground at the Cantonment Oglethorpe site was subsequently subdivided and developed into Lloyd Ward. Under date of July 22, 1914 there was a clarifying ordinance passed by City Council in connection with the fact that portions of the Park Extension were being used as playgrounds. This Act states that such use "shall not be a relinquishment of any right which the Military Companies of Savannah may have in said Parade Ground, or in the use thereof, the right sof the Volunteer Companies being hereby confirmed and preserved."

Finally, there was "an Ordinance passed by the Mayor and Aldermen, in Council assembled, July 11, 1923, and on file in the office of the Clerk of Council" which reads in part as follows: "NOW THEREFORE, in view of the fact that the City of Savannah made the exchange mentioned and has received the benefits, and yet has failed to make any formal transfer, it is hereby ordained by the Mayor and Aldermen of the City of Savannah in Council assembled, that the title and right of the Military companies of Savannah through their Commanding Officers, in the ground known as the Parade Ground or Forsyth Park Exension, the same being bounded on the north by Forsyth Park proper, on the east by Drayton Street, on the south by Park Avenue and on the west by Whitaker Street, as a Military Parade Ground, are fully recognized and confirmed as fully and as completely as if a deed of exchange had been made. Be it furth ordained that all ordinances and parts of ordinances in conflict with this ordinance be and the same are hereby repealed."

== The Civil War Memorial ==
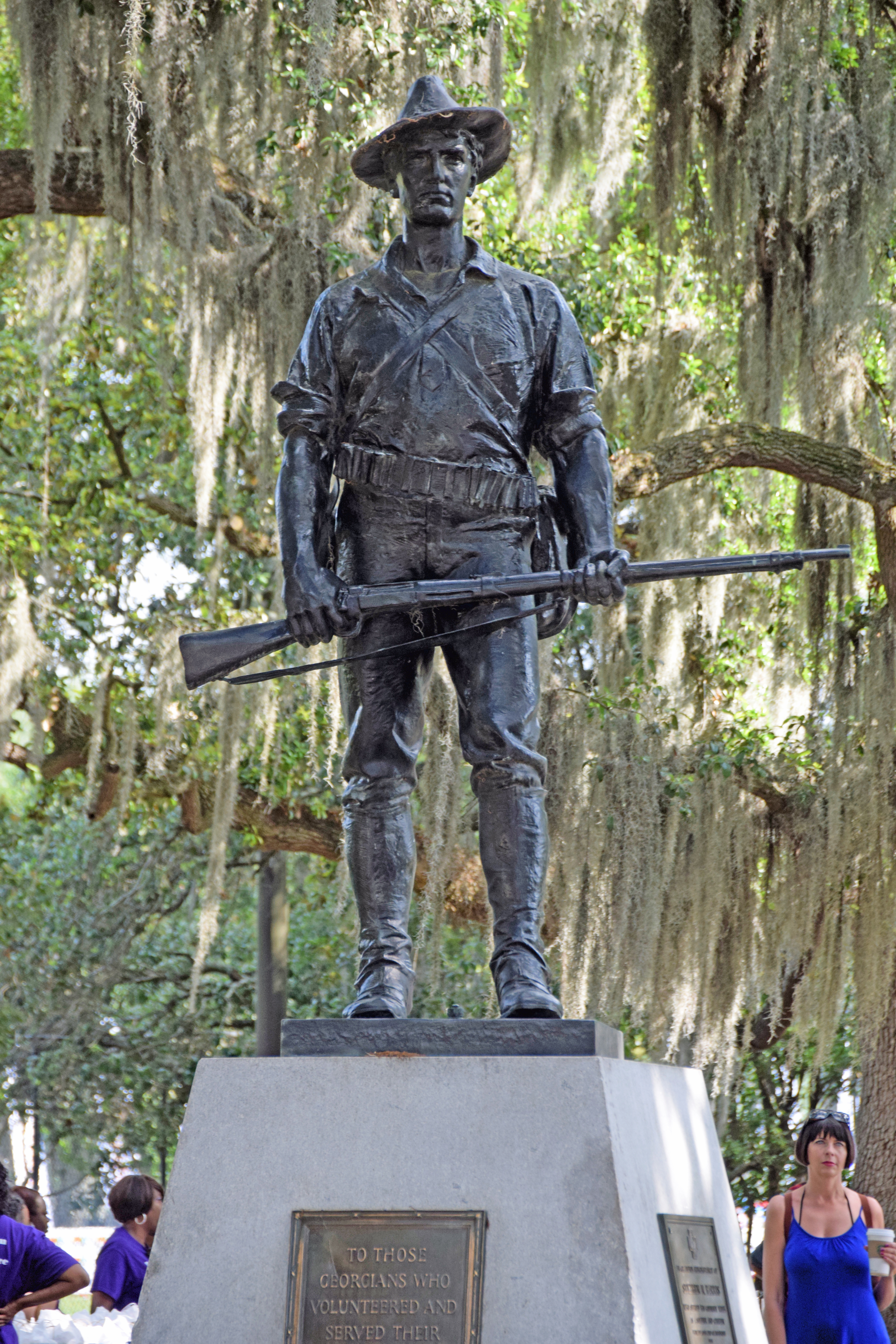
"The Georgia Volunteer," a memorial to the Spanish–American War soldiers of Georgia

Built in 1874, Forsyth Park hosts a large monument to Confederate dead. One of the first and largest in the state, the monument was unveiled in 1874, with the bronze statue of a Confederate soldier added several years later in 1879.

== Spanish-American War Memorial ==
Standing at the south end of Forsyth Park, The Hiker is a statue created by Theo Alice Ruggles Kitson. It commemorates the American soldiers who fought in the Spanish–American War, the Boxer Rebellion and the Philippine-American War. The first version of it was made for the University of Minnesota in 1906, The Hiker depicts a hero stripped of his parade uniform and shown as a soldier reacting to the challenges of the battlefield. Officially called "The Georgia Volunteer," it was erected in Savannah because that city contributed more Spanish–American War soldiers per capita than any other city in Georgia. A drunk driver damaged the statue on January 18, 2025. The statue was restored and returned to the park on July 17, 2025.

Bonaventure Cemetery just outside of Savannah on a bluff of the Wilmington River has a section dedicated to the Spanish-American War Veterans from Worth Bagley Camp. It is the nation's second-largest area dedicated to those killed in the Spanish-American War.

== Fountain ==
As one of the most photographed fountains in Savannah, the Forsyth Park Fountain sits on a direct line of continuation along the Bull Street corridor. The fountain was manufactured by Janes, Beebe & Company in Bronx County, New York – an iron foundry owned by Adrian Janes, which also created iron work for the Capitol dome of the U.S. Capitol Building and railings for the Brooklyn Bridge.

The fountain was installed in 1858. Its design by John Howard is derived from the work of the French sculptor, Michel Lienard, and is reminiscent of the fountains at Place de la Concorde in Paris. Other examples of this fountain can be found in Poughkeepsie, New York; Madison, Indiana; and Cuzco, Peru.

At the time of installation, Parisian urban planning was centered on the development of residential neighborhoods radiating out from a central green space. The Parisian model of developing large city parks was emulated by cities in the United States, including Savannah.

Every St. Patrick's Day, the fountain is ceremoniously turned green in celebration of Savannah's Irish heritage.

The fountain appears in many films, including The Longest Yard, Cape Fear, Forrest Gump and Midnight in the Garden of Good and Evil.

A restoration of the fountain was begun in June 2025, and completed six months later.

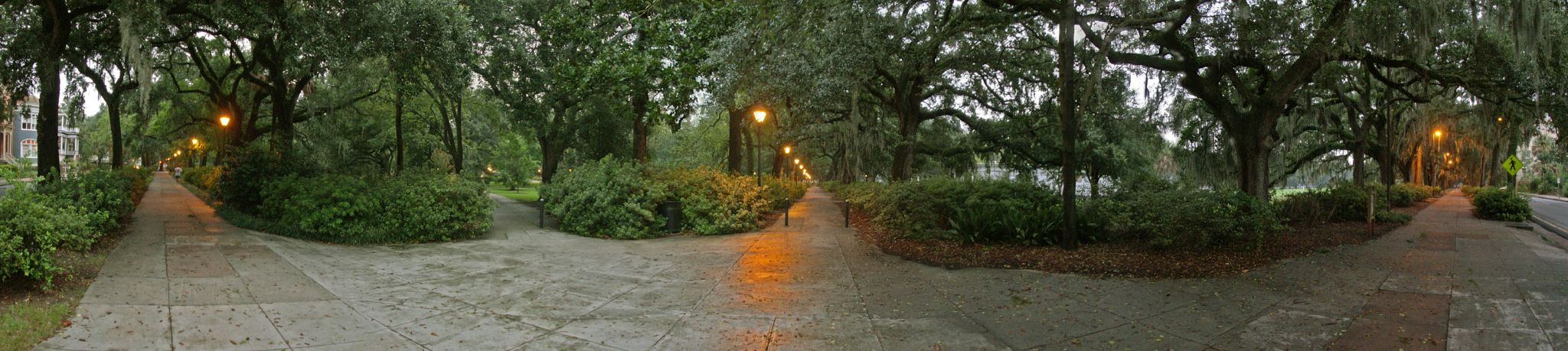
Panoramic view of Forsyth Park from Whitaker Street, on the park's western side

== Surrounding buildings ==
The below buildings each occupy one of the ten blocks on the three sides of the northern half park and are noted as historic structures by the Historic Preservation Department of the Chatham County-Savannah Metropolitan Planning Commission. These blocks fall in one of four wards. Clockwise from the north, these are Monterey Ward, Calhoun Ward, Forsyth Ward and Chatham Ward. Other wards abutting Forsyth Park are Lloyd Ward, Gallie Ward, and Cuthbert Ward. The properties are listed, again clockwise from the north, from the first East Gaston Street block.

John Berendt, author of 1994's Midnight in the Garden of Good and Evil, lived in Forsyth Park Apartments in the southwestern corner of the park while writing the book.

Property	Image	Address	Date	Note
Edmund Molyneux House		450 Bull Street	1857	By John S. Norris. Molyneux was consul at Savannah from 1832 to 1862. After the Civil War, the house was purchased by Henry R. Jackson. Now the Oglethorpe Club
Mills B. Lane House		26 East Gaston Street	1909	By Mowbray & Uffinger
Mary C. Lane House		102 East Gaston Street	1927	A close copy of the Olde Pink House, commissioned by Mary Comer Lane
J.J. Dale & David Wells Row House		108–116 East Gaston Street	1884	
William Wade House		120 East Gaston Street	1883	By John R. Hamlet. Wade was superintendent of the Savannah Cotton Press Association and president of the United Hydraulic Cotton Press Company
Granite Hall (part of SCAD)		126 East Gaston Street	1881	Formerly known as the Fred Hull House; by John M. Williams
Old Savannah/Candler Hospital		516 Drayton Street (116 East Huntingdon Street)	1819/1876	
William Baker House		612 Drayton Street	1872	
William Hone House		618 Drayton Street	1872	Today's Clinard Hall, part of SCAD
Lai Wa Hall, SCAD		622 Drayton Street	1890	
Lewis Kayton House/Mansion on Forsyth Park		700 Drayton Street	1889	By Alfred Eichberg
804 Drayton Street		804 Drayton Street		
Confederate Memorial Hall (former)		808 Drayton Street		
814–816 Drayton Street		814–816 Drayton Street		
106 West Gwinnett Street		106 West Gwinnett Street	1932	
705 Whitaker Street		705 Whitaker Street	1900	
703 Whitaker Street		703 Whitaker Street	1890	
Joseph Chestnut House		701 Whitaker Street	1892	
Forsyth Park Inn		102 West Hall Street	1899 (by)	
615–617 Whitaker Street		615–617 Whitaker Street	1899	
611 Whitaker Street & carriage house		611 Whitaker Street and carriage house	1894	
William Holt House		609 Whitaker Street	1886	
605 Whitaker Street		605 Whitaker Street	1886	
603 Whitaker Street		603 Whitaker Street	1888	
601 Whitaker Street		601 Whitaker Street	1883	
Metts-McNeil House		513 Whitaker Street	1903	Built for Lawrence McNeill by G. L. Norrman
John Williamson House		509 Whitaker Street	1870	John P. Williamson Jr. was one of the wealthiest real-estate owners and planters in Savannah in the first half of the 19th century. The home was the rendezvous for army officers following the Mexican war and the Indian wars in Florida. Mansard roof added 1911
Magnolia Hall		503 Whitaker Street	1883	Built for Jacob Guerard Heyward, the great-grandson of Thomas Heyward Jr.
W. B. Hodgson Hall		501 Whitaker Street	1876	By the American Institute of Architects' founder Detlef Lienau; on the NRHP
Israel Dasher House		124 West Gaston Street	1858	
Gustavus Holcombe House		116 West Gaston Street	1852	
118 West Gaston Street		118 West Gaston Street	1885	
George Cubbedge House		112–114 West Gaston Street	1852/1875	Cubbedge was the owner of an oil company
Nathan Brown House		110 West Gaston Street	1874/1898	
Thomas Holcombe House		104 West Gaston Street	1856	Now administrative offices for the Georgia Historical Society
George Gray House (Gray–Minis House)		24 West Gaston Street	1862	Altered in 1871, 1874 and 1907
William F. Brantley House		20 West Gaston Street	1857	By John S. Norris
