= Drayton Street =

Prominent street in Savannah, Georgia

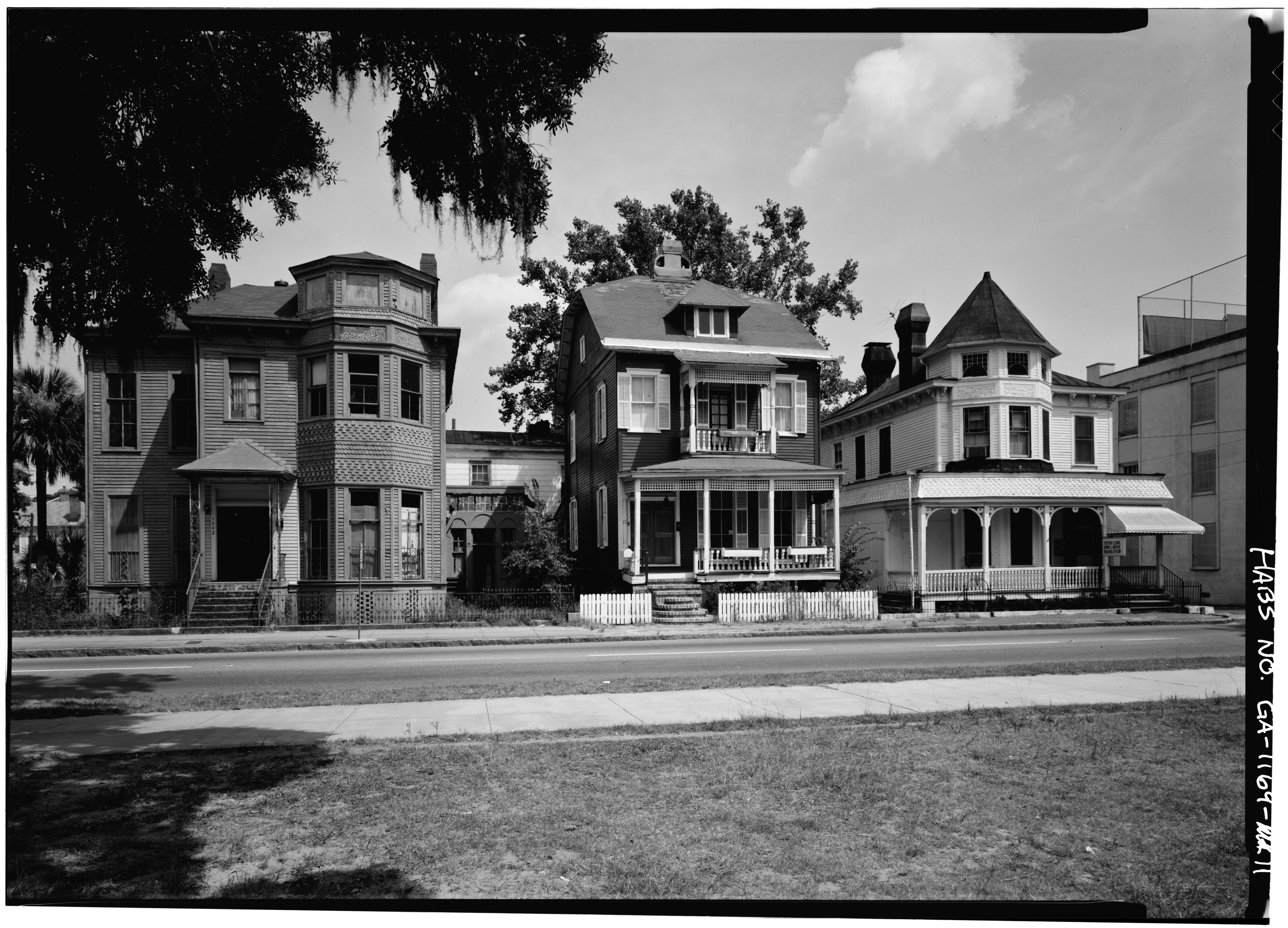
- A mid-20th-century view of the stretch of Drayton Street at the southeastern corner of Forsyth Park
- Namesake: Ann Drayton
- Length: 2 mi (3.2 km)
- Location: Savannah, Georgia, U.S.
- North end: East Bay Street
- South end: East Victory Drive (U.S. Route 80)

Drayton Street is a prominent street in Savannah, Georgia, United States. Located between Bull Street to the west and Abercorn Street to the east, it runs for about 2 miles (3.2 km) from East Bay Street in the north to East Victory Drive (U.S. Route 80) in the south. It is named for Ann Drayton, a member of a noted family in Charleston, South Carolina, who had lent four sawyers to assist colonists in building one of the first homes in Savannah. The street is one-way (northbound). Its northern section passes through the Savannah Historic District, a National Historic Landmark District.

On the northern side of East Bay Street, beneath the Savannah Cotton Exchange, the Drayton Street Ramp leads down through Factors Walk to River Street at the Savannah River. In the 19th century, the city allowed the Exchange to build on top of ramp, as long as they left the ramp accessible below, hence its unique design. Sometime after 1857, the ramp was walled off, preventing access to and from River Street via Bay Street. Claghorn and Cunningham had petitioned the city council to erect a wall at the foot of the street to prevent the flow of sand down from the bluff which would impede their building plans.

Drayton Street runs beside nine squares. From north to south:

To the west of

- Reynolds Square
- Oglethorpe Square
- Lafayette Square
- Taylor Square

To the east of

- Johnson Square
- Wright Square
- Chippewa Square
- Madison Square
- Monterey Square

It also forms the eastern boundary of Forsyth Park.

== Notable buildings and structures ==
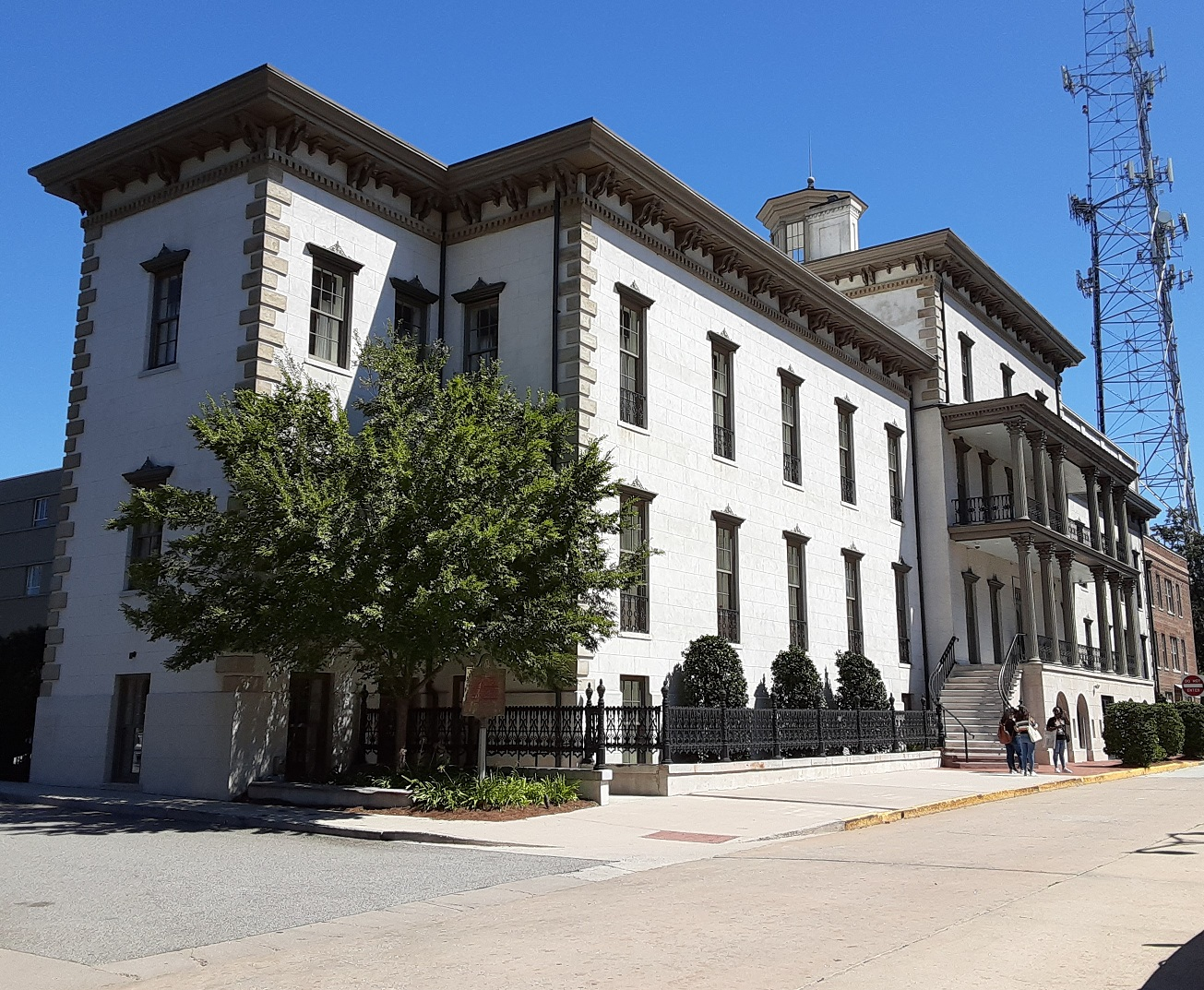
The former Savannah/Candler Hospital overlooks the northeastern corner of Forsyth Park

Below is a selection of notable buildings and structures on Drayton Street, all in Savannah's Historic District. From north to south:

- 9 Drayton Street (1853), built for George Wayne Anderson; later owned by Confederate Army veteran Edward Clifford Anderson Jr.
- Citizens Bank Building, 15 Drayton Street (1896), now part of the Savannah College of Art and Design (SCAD)
- Henrietta Cohen Property, 312–214 Drayton Street (1882)
- Andrew Low Carriage House, 330 Drayton Street (c. 1849)
- Savannah/Candler Hospital, 516 Drayton Street (1819), former site of the hospital, now part of SCAD
- William Baker House, 612 Drayton Street (1872)
- William Hone House, 618 Drayton Street (1872)
