= DeWitt, Georgia =

- Unincorporated community
- Location within Georgia Location within the United States
- Coordinates: 31°25′12″N 84°08′24″W
- Country: United States
- State: Georgia
- County: Mitchell
- Elevation: 171 ft (52 m)
- Time zone: UTC-5 (Eastern (EST))
  - Summer (DST): UTC-4 (EDT)
- ZIP code: 31716
- Area code: 229

DeWitt is an unincorporated community located in Mitchell County, Georgia, United States.

== History ==
A post office called Dewitt was established in 1887, and remained in operation until 1926. The community was named after Dewitt C. Bacon, a first settler.
