= Whitaker Street =

Prominent street in Savannah, Georgia

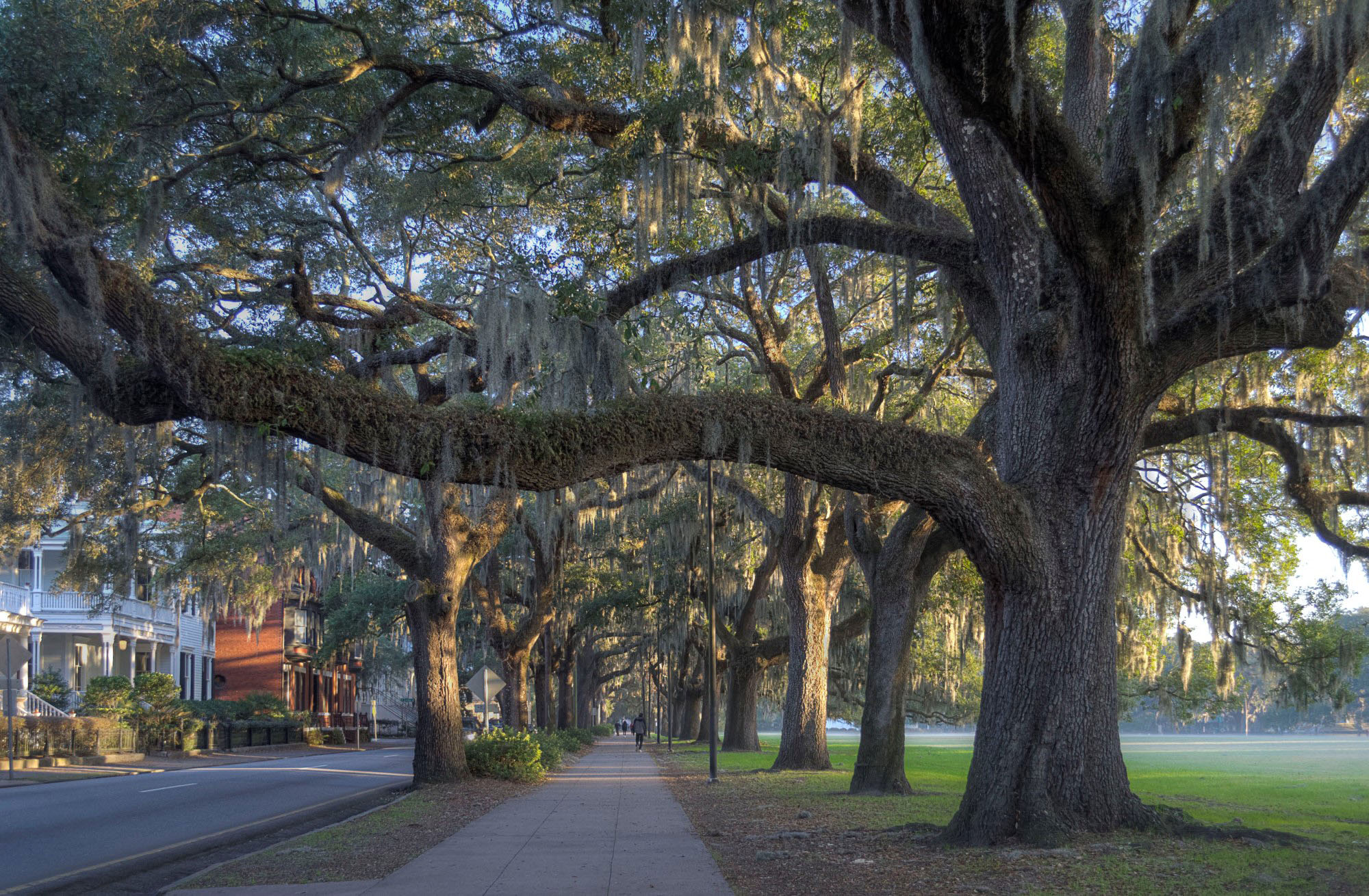
- Looking north along Whitaker Street from the edge of Forsyth Park
- Namesake: Benjamin Whitaker
- Length: 2.07 mi (3.33 km)
- Location: Savannah, Georgia, U.S.
- North end: West Bay Street
- South end: West Victory Drive (U.S. Route 80)

Whitaker Street is a prominent street in Savannah, Georgia, United States. Located between Barnard Street to the west and Bull Street to the east, it runs for about 2.07 miles (3.33 km) from West Bay Street in the north to West Victory Drive (U.S. Route 80) in the south. Its directional flow is one-way (southbound). The street is named for Benjamin Whitaker, surveyor general of the Province of South Carolina.

Its northern section passes through the Savannah Historic District, a National Historic Landmark District.

Whitaker Street runs beside ten squares. From north to south:

To the west of

- Johnson Square
- Wright Square
- Chippewa Square
- Madison Square
- Monterey Square

To the east of

- Ellis Square
- Telfair Square
- Orleans Square
- Pulaski Square
- Chatham Square

It also forms the western boundary of Forsyth Park.

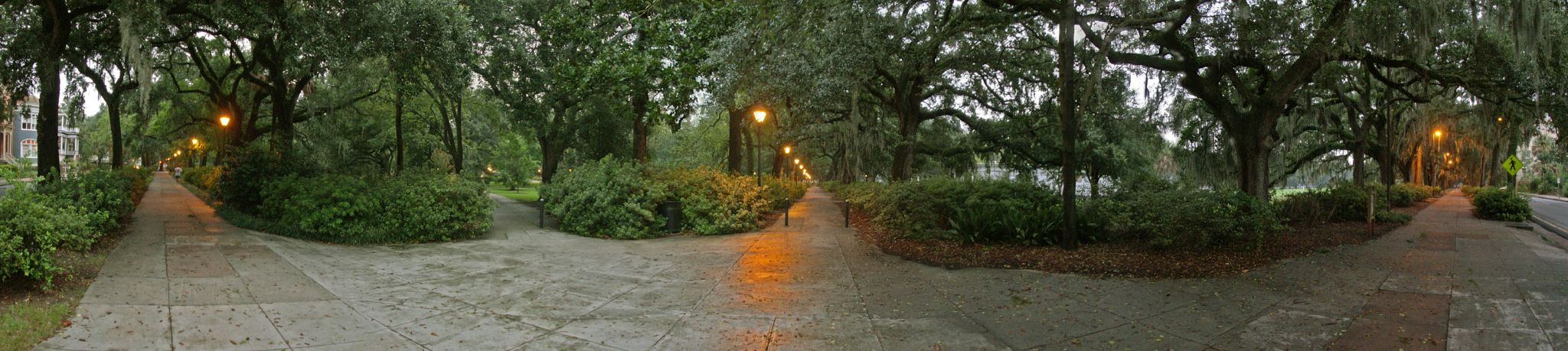
Panoramic view of Forsyth Park from Whitaker Street, on the park's western side

== Notable buildings and structures ==
Below is a selection of notable buildings and structures on Whitaker Street, all in Savannah's Historic District. From north to south:

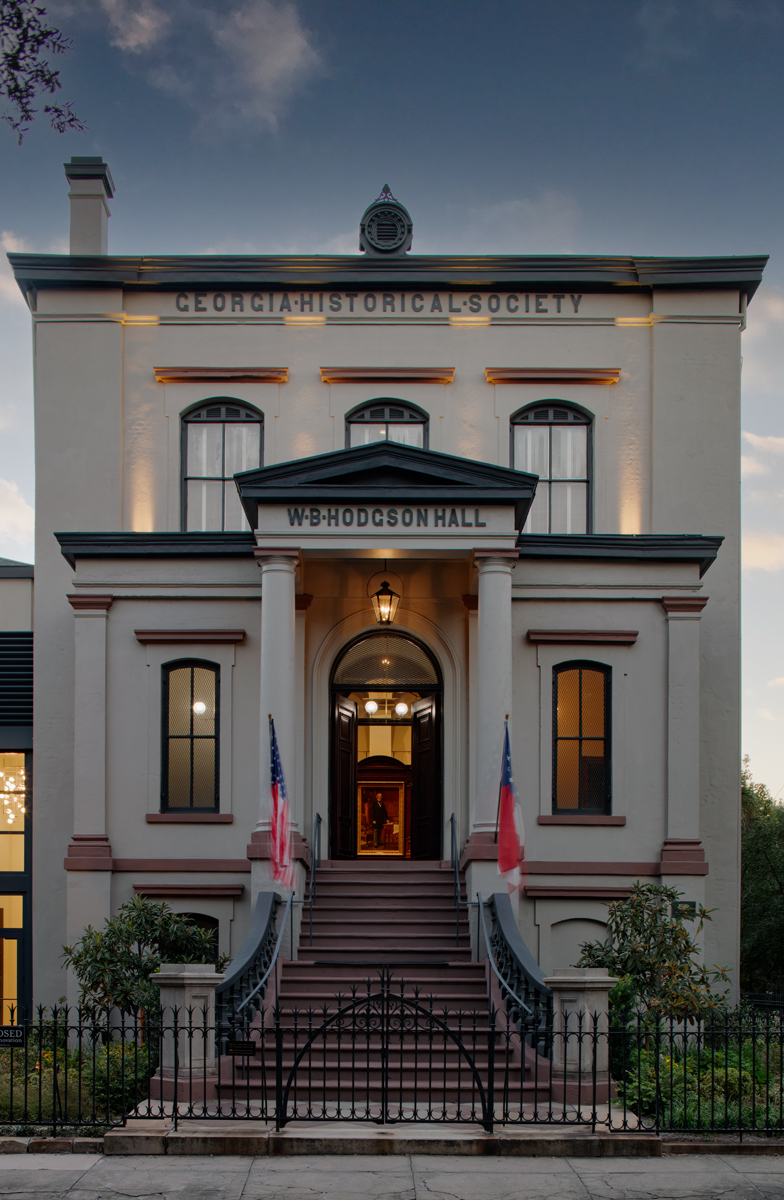
W. B. Hodgson Hall, in the northwest corner of Forsyth Park, is the home of the Georgia Historical Society

- Savannah Morning News Building, 5 Whitaker Street (1875)
- 37 Whitaker Street (1890)
- 116 Whitaker Street (1866)
- 144–152 Whitaker Street (1898)
- Benjamin Purse Property, 311 Whitaker Street (1885)
- Julia Tucker Property, 333–335 Whitaker Street (1852)
- 339 Whitaker Street (1910)
- Frederick Kuck Property, 411–417 Whitaker Street (1899)
- 422 Whitaker Street (1880)
- W. B. Hodgson Hall, 501 Whitaker Street (1876)
- Magnolia Hall, 503 Whitaker Street (1883)
- John Williamson House, 509 Whitaker Street (1870)
- Metts–McNeil House, 513 Whitaker Street (1903)
- 601 Whitaker Street (1883)
- 603 Whitaker Street (1888)
- 605 Whitaker Street (1886)
- William Holt House, 609 Whitaker Street (1886)
- 611 Whitaker Street (1894)
- Joseph Chestnut House, 701 Whitaker Street (1892)
- 703 Whitaker Street (1890)
- 705 Whitaker Street (1900)
