= United States Attorney for the District of Georgia =

Defunct U.S. federal prosecutor's office

United States Attorney for the District of Georgia is a defunct United States Attorney's office based in the state of Georgia until 1883. The U.S. Attorney for Georgia was the chief law enforcement officer for the United States District Court for the District of Georgia, one of the 13 original district courts. The district was succeeded by the United States Attorney for the Northern District of Georgia and the United States Attorney for the Southern District of Georgia.

== Office holders ==
- Matthew McAllister (1789-1797)
- Charles Jackson (1797-1798)
- George Woodruff (1798-1802)
- David B. Mitchell (1802-1804)
- William B. Bullock (1804-1813)
- Charles Harris (1813-1815)
- William Davies (1815-1819)
- Richard W. Habersham (1819-1827)
- Matthew H. McAllister (1827-1835)
- Robert M. Charlton (1835-1836)
- William H. Stiles (1836-1838)
- John E. Ward (1838-1839)
- Robert M. Charlton (1839-1840)
- Solomon Cohen (1840-1842) - possibly Solomon Cohen Jr.?
- Alexander Drysdale (1842-1844)
- Richard A. Cuyler (1844)
- Henry R. Jackson (1844) - possibly Henry Rootes Jackson?
- Henry Williams (1850-1853)
- George S. Owens (1853-1856)
- George A. Gordon (1856-1857)
- Joseph Ganahl (1857-1860)
- Hamilton Gouper (1860)
- John D. Pope (1870-1876)
- Henry P. Farrow (1876-1880)
- John S. Bigby (1880-1883)
