= James Morrison (mayor) =

American attorney (1789–1831)

- Born: March 21, 1789; Derry, New Hampshire, U.S.
- Died: December 17, 1831 (aged 42); Savannah, Georgia, U.S.
- Resting place: Colonial Park Cemetery, Savannah, Georgia, U.S.
- Spouse: Eliza Johnston (m. 1812–1831; his death)

James Morrison (March 21, 1789 – December 17, 1831) was an attorney, city alderman and mayor of Savannah, Georgia.

== Early life ==
Morrison was born in 1789 in Derry, New Hampshire, to Scottish-born Reverend William Morrison and Jane Fullerton. He was born a twin with sister Sally.

He graduated from Dartmouth College in 1807. In 1811, he graduated from Litchfield Law School, where he met George Whitefield of Savannah, Georgia, and his eighteen-year-old cousin Eliza, daughter of the wealthy merchant Matthew Johnston and Elizabeth Whitefield, niece of Reverend George Whitefield. Morrison arranged for the pair to visit his father in Derry.

== Career ==
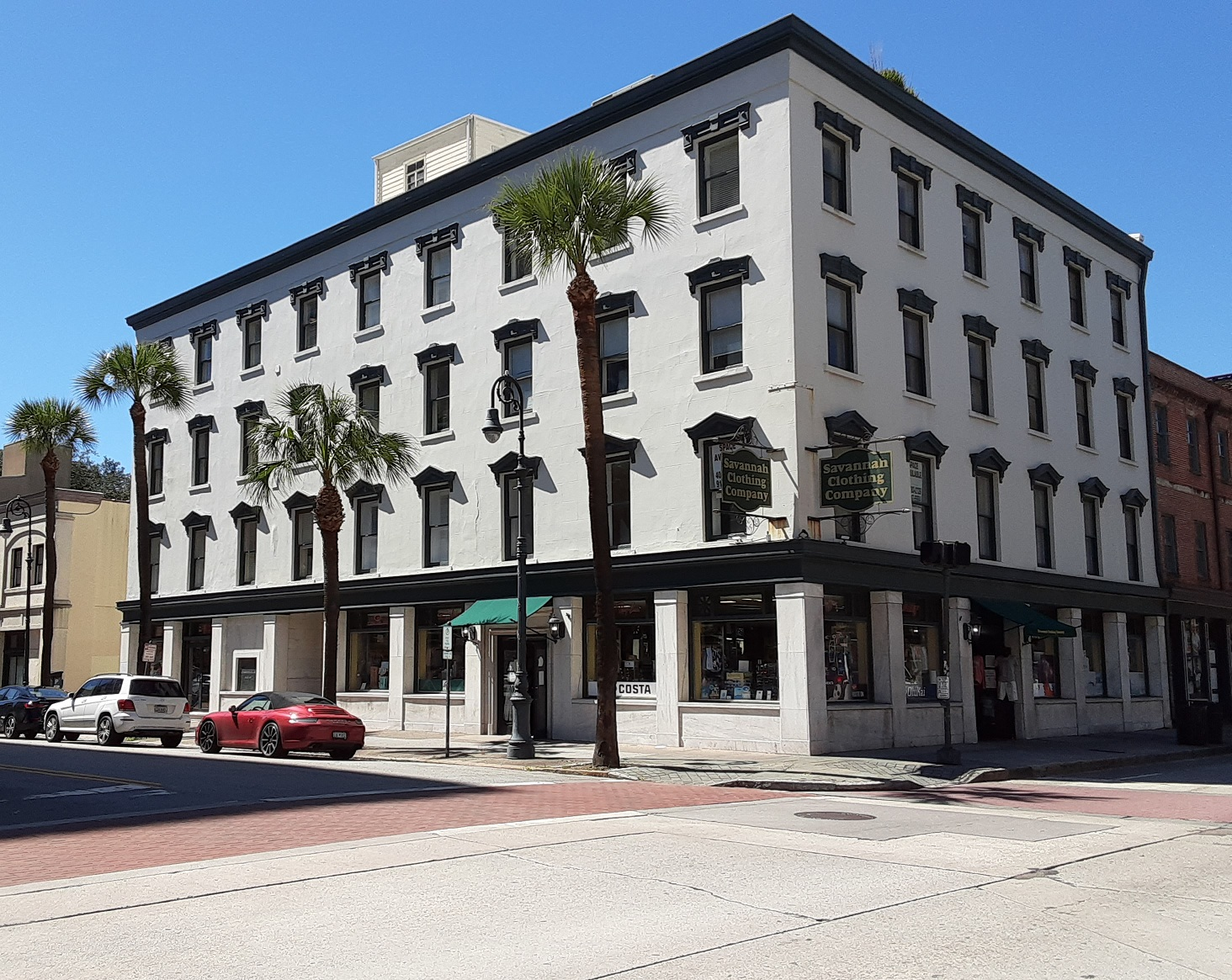
The James Morrison Building, at the head of Bull Street in Savannah, stands in the shadow of City Hall

After graduation, Morrison moved to Savannah. In 1819, he had built a three-story building at the corner of Bull Street and Bay Street which became his attorney's office. It stood across Bay Street from the City Exchange, the predecessor to today's City Hall.

Morrison became the 17th mayor of Savannah in 1821, succeeding Thomas U. P. Charlton, who left his role early to take over as Judge of the Superior Court. Morrison served for 3.5 terms. He served as a city alderman for eight years, and was also secretary of the Union Society, a trustee of the Chatham Academy and a trustee of the Bank of the State of Georgia. He had been chosen as the director of the Marine and Fire Insurance Company in 1818.

== Personal life ==
In 1812, Morrison married Eliza, with whom he had six known children: Eliza, Marion, James, William, Anna and Jane. William died around the age of two, during the 1820 yellow fever epidemic. The couple lived at the corner of Broughton Street and Drayton Street in Savannah, a property which narrowly avoided destruction in the great fire of 1820.

When Morrison's father-in-law, Matthew Johnston, died in 1802, he left his sizeable wealth to Eliza and her brother James.

== Death ==
In October 1831, Morrison's brother, William, visited from Connecticut. He was struck down with fever and died at the end of the month. A month and a half late, Morrison died, aged 42. He was interred in Savannah's Colonial Park Cemetery. His widow survived him by 41 years; she was buried in the city's Laurel Grove Cemetery upon her death, aged 79.
