= John Noel (mayor) =

American politician

5th Mayor of Savannah, Georgia
- In office 1804–1807
- Preceded by: Charles Harris
- Succeeded by: William Davies
- In office 1796–1797
- Preceded by: William Stephens
- Succeeded by: John Glen

Personal details
- Born: June 18, 1762 New York City, Province of New York
- Died: November 1, 1817 (aged 55) Savannah, Georgia, U.S.
- Resting place: Laurel Grove Cemetery, Savannah, Georgia, U.S.
- Spouse: Sarah Cuttler Dennis

John Noel (June 18, 1762 – November 1, 1817) was an American politician who served as mayor of Savannah, Georgia, from 1796 to 1797 and from 1804 to 1807.

== Biography ==
Noel was born on June 18, 1762, in New York City, the son of Experience (née Young) and Garrat Noel (died 1776). His father was a bookseller who had emigrated from England.

He was raised in Elizabethtown, New Jersey. In 1777, he graduated from Princeton University, and was licensed as an attorney in 1783. In 1788, he moved to Georgia, where he worked as a judge in Augusta, the county seat of Richmond County, before moving to Savannah in the 1790s. He was elected to a one-year term as mayor of Savannah in 1796 and then served on the city council (1798–1799 and 1801–1802). He was once again elected as mayor in 1804 and served three consecutive terms (July 9, 1804 to September 14, 1807). In 1805, he was credited by the governor John Milledge for successfully preventing an outbreak of smallpox.

Noel was an investor in the Georgia Company, which was part of the Yazoo Land Fraud of 1795.

== Personal life ==
In 1784, Noel married Sarah Cuttler Dennis.

== Death ==
He died in Savannah on November 1, 1817. He was interred in the city's Laurel Grove Cemetery; his widow survived him by nineteen years and was buried beside him.
