= Edward J. Black =

American politician (1806–1846)

Edward Junius Black (October 30, 1806 – September 1, 1846) was a slave owner, United States Representative and lawyer from Georgia. He was born in Beaufort District, South Carolina, a son of William Black and Sarah Hanson Reid. His son was U.S. Representative George Robison Black.

William Black, the father, was a planter in the Beaufort district, South Carolina but after suffering a serious financial setback, he moved the family to the Barnwell district where he pursued his planting interests. At about age eight, Edward was sent to live with his mother's brother, Robert R. Reid, a successful attorney of Augusta, Georgia.

Edward J. Black graduated from the Richmond Academy in Augusta, Georgia, where he served as secretary of the academy's St. Cecilia Society. He never attended college. He studied law under his uncle, gained admittance to the state bar at the age of 21, and began practicing law in Augusta. In 1826, he entered into a law partnership with his uncle, Robert R. Reid, with an office on Washington Street in Augusta.

About 1827, he contracted tuberculosis. His mother had died of the disease, and his anticipation of the same fate greatly affected his mental health. Yet he was noted for his wit and humor, and fond of poetry. Between 1826 and 1829 a number of his own verses were published in the Augusta Constitutionalist under the pen name "Quip, Crank & Co."

At the age of 24, Black was elected to the Georgia House of Representatives as a representative from Richmond County, GA, and served from 1829 to 1831. Notably, in the legislature he made serious efforts to have the University of Georgia (then known as Franklin College) relocated from Athens to Milledgeville, which was then the capital of Georgia. This effort was driven by a running feud he had with the students over quality of scholarship at the institution.

In 1831, Edward J. Black was the prosecutor for the Superior Court of Richmond County, Georgia in the case of "the State vs Surry, a Slave". Surry was indicted for the February 6, 1831 murder of another African American by stabbing. The judge on the bench of Middle Circuit of Georgia, which then included Richmond County, was Judge William White Holt. The defense attorneys for Surry were General Thomas Glascock, Andrew Jackson Miller, and Augustus Baldwin Longstreet, a slave owner and vehement pro-slavery and pro-secessionist advocate. The trial concluded on February 21, 1831 with a verdict of guilty.

He was considered by the legislature for election to the position of Attorney General of the state of Georgia, but was defeated by one vote.

Black moved to Screven County, Georgia, in 1832; at that time, he married Augusta George Anna Kirkland, and greatly grew his slave ownership from a few slaves to "thirty or forty slaves," according to his son's later recollections. The 1840 Census enumeration of Edward J. Black shows he owned 20 enslaved people. The 1850 Census of Slave Inhabitants enumerates his widow as "owner" of 30 enslaved persons.

In 1838, he was elected to the United States House of Representatives as a Whig to represent Georgia in the 26th United States Congress and served one term from March 4, 1839, until March 3, 1841, as he lost his reelection bid as a Democrat for a second term in that seat in 1840; however, he did win election as a Democrat to fill a vacancy in the 27th Congress caused by the resignations of Georgia Representatives Julius C. Alford, William Crosby Dawson and Eugenius Aristides Nisbet.

In 1840, Edward J. Black, with two of his colleagues (Walter T. Colquitt and Mark A. Cooper) of the U.S. House of Representatives, diverged from the rest of the Congressional delegation from Georgia by refusing to support Gen. William Henry Harrison for the Presidency.

He won reelection to that seat in the general election of 1842 and served in the 28th Congress and his second stint in the U.S. congress spanned from January 3, 1842, to March 3, 1845. Black lost his reelection bid in 1844 and returned to practicing law.

He died on September 1, 1846, at the residence of Mr. G. Robison, his wife's grandfather, in the Barnwell District. He was buried in a family cemetery near Millettville, South Carolina, in Allendale County.

U.S. House of Representatives
Preceded by George W. Owens	Member of the U.S. House of Representatives from Georgia's at-large congressional district March 4, 1839 – March 3, 1841	Succeeded by Thomas Flournoy Foster
Preceded by Julius C. Alford	Member of the U.S. House of Representatives from Georgia's at-large congressional district January 3, 1842 – March 3, 1845	Succeeded by George W. Towns
