= William Gaston Bulloch =

American physician (1815–1885)

- Born: August 4, 1815; Savannah, Georgia, U.S.
- Died: June 23, 1885 (aged 69); Savannah, Georgia, U.S.
- Resting place: Laurel Grove Cemetery, Savannah, Georgia, U.S.
- Occupation: Physician
- Spouse: Mary Eliza Lewis (m. 1851–1885; his death)

William Gaston Bulloch (August 4, 1815 – June 23, 1885) was an American medical doctor. He primarily practiced in Savannah, Georgia.

== Life and career ==
Bulloch was born in 1815 in Savannah, Georgia, to John Irvine Bulloch and Charlotte Glen, daughter of John Glen, the first Chief Justice of Georgia. His siblings were James and Jane. He was a descendant of politician Archibald Bulloch and fellow physician Noble Wimberley Jones.

He graduated Yale College in 1835 and the University of Pennsylvania three years later. He studied for his medical education in Paris for nearly two years, before setting out as a physician in Savannah in 1840. He was noted as an oculist.

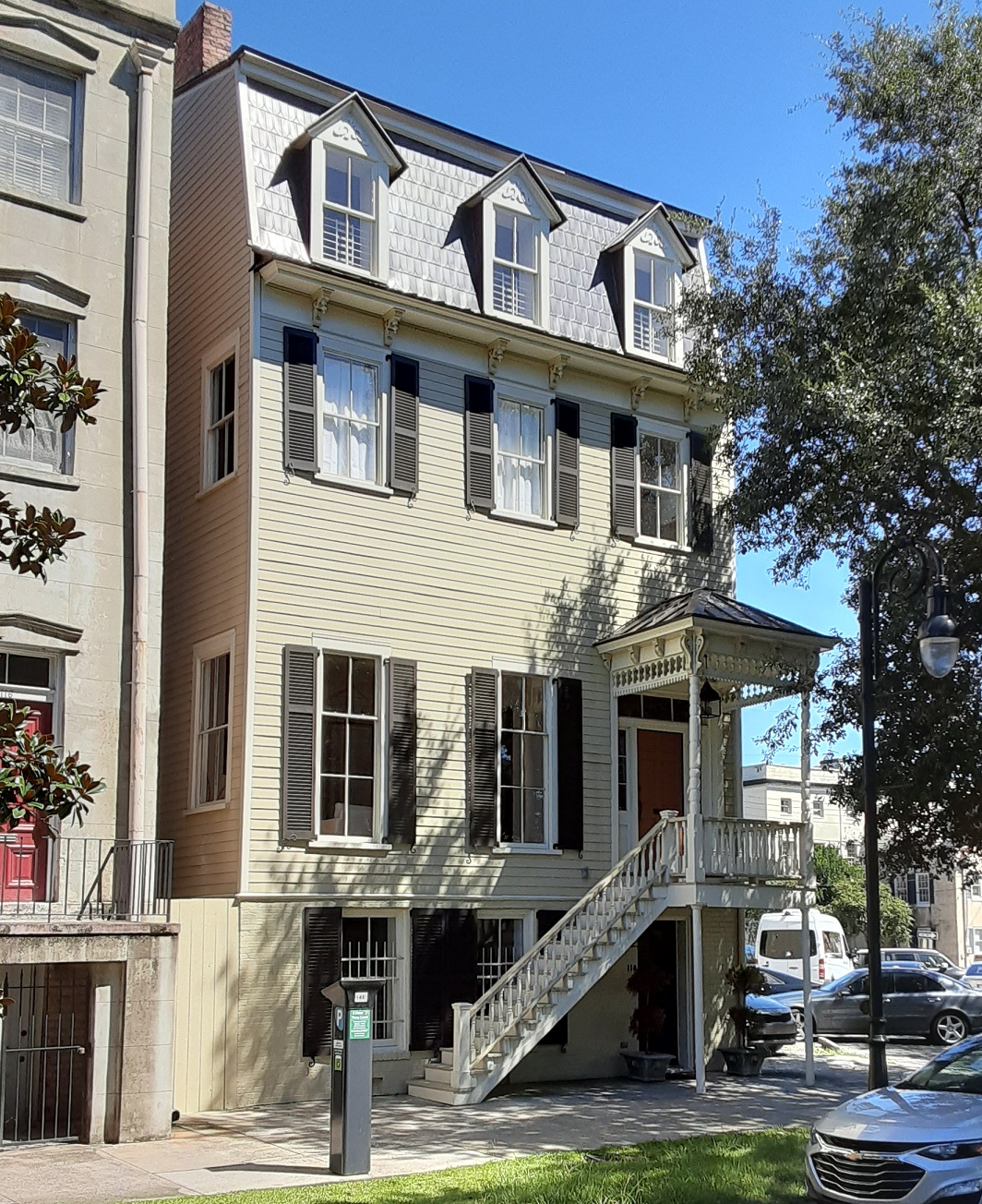
Bulloch's home, 114 West Liberty Street in Savannah, Georgia

In 1853, Bulloch was a co-founder of Savannah Medical College, also serving as its chair of surgery. He also served as the president of Georgia Medical Society.

In 1851, Bulloch married Mary Eliza Lewis, a member of the Georgia chapter of the National Society of the Colonial Dames of America. They had three children who lived to adulthood: Joseph, Robert and Emma.

He was awarded two large silver pitchers by the residents of Beaufort County, North Carolina, for his work in treating victims of the 1854 yellow fever pandemic.

He was elected a member of the Gynecological Society of Boston in 1869.

He served during the latter stages of the Civil War as a surgeon of the Provisional Army of the Confederate States in Richmond, Virginia, and as head of Broughton Street Hospital in Savannah. He also served as an alderman on Savannah's city council.

He was practicing with his son, Dr. Joseph G. Bulloch, in Savannah in 1880.

== Death ==
Bulloch died in 1885, aged 69, at his 114 West Liberty Street home in Savannah. He had experienced gastroenteritis for ten days. He was interred in the city's Laurel Grove Cemetery. Bulloch's widow survived him by 17 years and was buried beside him.
