= William Thorne Williams =

American politician (1785–1868)

20th Mayor of Savannah, Georgia
- In office 1843–1844
- Preceded by: Richard Arnold
- Succeeded by: Richard Wayne
- In office 1841–1842
- Preceded by: Robert M. Charlton
- Succeeded by: Richard Arnold
- In office 1833–1834
- Preceded by: George Welshman Owens
- Succeeded by: William Washington Gordon
- In office 1828–1830
- Preceded by: Joseph Webber Jackson
- Succeeded by: William Richard Waring

Personal details
- Born: 1785 Philadelphia, Pennsylvania
- Died: 1868 (aged 82–83) Savannah, Georgia, U.S.

William T. Williams (1785–1868) was an American politician who served as mayor of Savannah, Georgia (1828–1830, 1833–1834, 1841–1842, and 1843–1844).

== Biography ==
Williams was born in 1785 in Philadelphia, Pennsylvania. He moved to Savannah where he worked as a printer, bookbinder, and operated a bookstore. In 1813, he became a member of the Chatham Artillery. In 1825, he was elected alderman and then was elected mayor in 1828 serving two terms until 1830. After mayor George Owen resigned on July 11, 1833, Williams completed the remainder of his term and then was again elected to a one-year term as mayor on September 9, 1833. He served as mayor for an additional two terms (1841–1842, and 1843–1844). He died in 1868.

He served as a curator for the Georgia Historical Society from 1838 until his death.
