= John Elliott Ward =

American politician

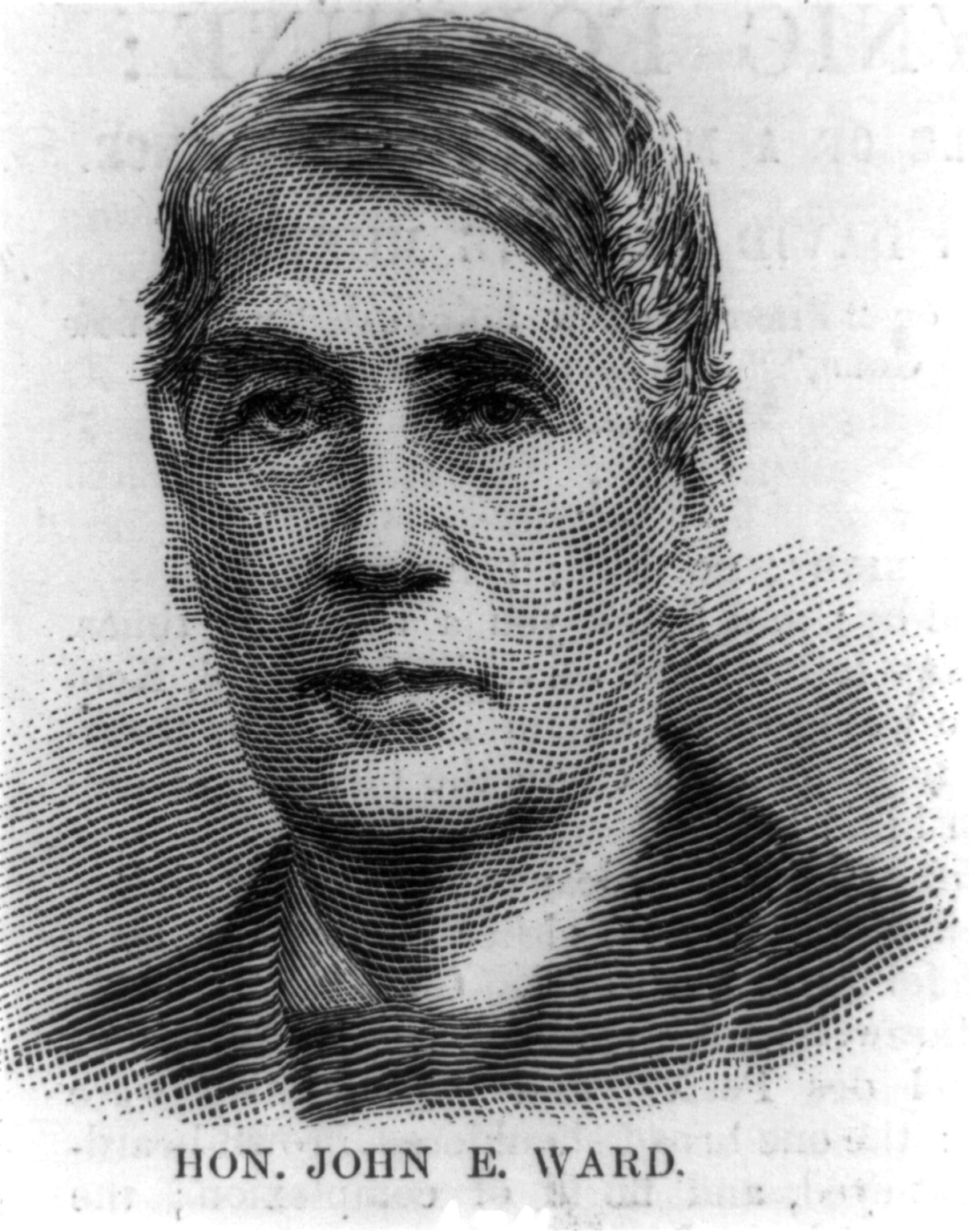

United States Minister to the Qing Empire
- In office August 10, 1859 – December 15, 1860
- President: James Buchanan
- Preceded by: William B. Reed
- Succeeded by: Anson Burlingame

Speaker of the Georgia House of Representatives
- In office 1853–1854
- Preceded by: James A. Meriwether
- Succeeded by: William H. Stiles

31st Mayor of Savannah, Georgia
- In office 1853–1854
- Preceded by: Richard Wayne
- Succeeded by: Edward C. Anderson

Personal details
- Born: John Elliott Ward; October 2, 1814 Sunbury, Georgia
- Died: November 30, 1902 (aged 88) Dorchester, Georgia
- Party: Democratic Party

John Elliott Ward (October 2, 1814 – November 30, 1902) was an American politician and diplomat.

== Biography ==
John Elliott Ward was born in Sunbury, Georgia on October 2, 1814.

He served as United States Attorney for Georgia, mayor of Savannah, Georgia, speaker of the Georgia House of Representatives, president of the Georgia State Senate, president of the 1856 Democratic National Convention, and United States Minister to China under James Buchanan. He resigned from his diplomatic post shortly after the outbreak of the American Civil War, returned to Savannah, and after the war, moved to New York City, where he practiced law for several years.

He was an anti-secessionist and spoke against the South leaving the Union. Ironically, he appears on the T-23 Confederate 10-dollar note.

He died in Dorchester (now Midway), Georgia on November 30, 1902.

== See also ==
- List of speakers of the Georgia House of Representatives
