= Thomas F. Foster =

American politician (1790–1848)

Thomas Flournoy Foster

Member of the U.S. House of Representatives from Georgia's at-large district
- In office March 4, 1829 – March 3, 1835
- Preceded by: District established
- Succeeded by: George Welshman Owens
- In office March 4, 1841 – March 3, 1843
- Preceded by: Edward Junius Black
- Succeeded by: William Henry Stiles

Chair of the House Judiciary Committee
- In office 1834–1835
- Preceded by: John Bell
- Succeeded by: Samuel Beardsley

Member of the Georgia House of Representatives
- In office 1822–1825

Personal details
- Born: Thomas Flournoy Foster; November 23, 1790 Greensboro, Georgia
- Died: September 14, 1848 (aged 57) Columbus, Georgia
- Resting place: Linwood Cemetery
- Party: Whig (since 1841); Jacksonian (1829-1835)
- Education: Franklin College of Arts and Sciences (A.B.); Litchfield Law School
- Profession: Lawyer

Thomas Flournoy Foster (November 23, 1790 – September 14, 1848) was an American politician and lawyer.

Foster was born in Greensboro, Georgia. He attended Franklin College, the founding college of the University of Georgia in Athens, and graduated in 1812 with a Bachelor of Arts (A.B.) degree. He studied at the Litchfield Law School, gained admittance to the state bar in 1816 and became a practicing attorney in Greensboro.

Foster was elected to the Georgia House of Representatives in 1822 and was reelected through 1825. In 1828, he won election to the 23rd United States Congress as a Jacksonian and served two additional terms before losing his reelection bid in 1834. He moved to Columbus, Georgia, the following year. In 1840, he returned to the U.S. House as a Whig in the 27th Congress. He only served one term in that position. He died in Columbus on September 14, 1848, and was buried in that city's Linwood Cemetery.

U.S. House of Representatives
Preceded by John Floyd	Member of the U.S. House of Representatives from Georgia's at-large congressional district March 4, 1829 – March 3, 1835	Succeeded by George W. Owens
Preceded by Edward J. Black	Member of the U.S. House of Representatives from Georgia's at-large congressional district March 4, 1841 – March 3, 1843	Succeeded by William H. Stiles
