= Richard Wayne (disambiguation) =

Richard Wayne was a mayor of Savannah, Georgia.

Richard Wayne may also refer to:

- Richard Wayne, character from Afterwards (1928 film)

== See also ==
- Richard William Leslie Wain, Welsh VC recipient
- Rick Wayne, St. Lucia media personality
