= William Stephens (judge) =

American judge

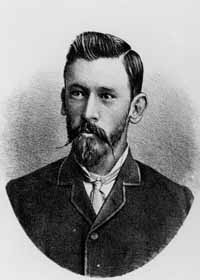

Judge of the United States District Court for the District of Georgia
- In office October 22, 1801 – October 13, 1818
- Appointed by: Thomas Jefferson
- Preceded by: Joseph Clay Jr.
- Succeeded by: William Davies

Mayor of Savannah, Georgia
- In office 1795–1796
- Preceded by: Thomas Gibbons
- Succeeded by: John Noel
- In office 1793–1794
- Preceded by: Joseph Habersham
- Succeeded by: Thomas Gibbons

Personal details
- Born: William Stephens; January 17, 1752 Beaulieu, Province of Georgia, British America
- Died: August 6, 1819 (aged 67) Savannah, Georgia

William Stephens (January 17, 1752 – August 6, 1819) was a United States district judge of the United States District Court for the District of Georgia.

== Education and career ==
Born on January 17, 1752, in Bewlie (now Beaulieu), Province of Georgia, British America, Stephens served in the Continental Army as a second lieutenant during the American Revolutionary War. He was later a colonel in the Chatham County, Georgia militia. He was a clerk for the Georgia Commons House of Assembly starting in 1775. He was Attorney General of the Province of Georgia until 1776. He was chief justice of the Supreme Court of Georgia starting in 1780. He was President of Savannah, Georgia starting in 1787. He was Mayor of Savannah from 1793 to 1794 and from 1795 to 1796. He was a judge of the Superior Court of Georgia.

== Federal judicial service ==
Stephens received a recess appointment from President Thomas Jefferson on October 22, 1801, to a seat on the United States District Court for the District of Georgia vacated by Judge Joseph Clay Jr. He was nominated to the same position by President Jefferson on January 6, 1802. He was confirmed by the United States Senate on January 26, 1802, and received his commission the same day. His service terminated on October 13, 1818, due to his resignation.

== Death ==
Stephens died on August 6, 1819, in Savannah.

== Sources ==
Legal offices
| Preceded by Joseph Clay Jr. | Judge of the United States District Court for the District of Georgia; 1801–1818 | Succeeded by William Davies |
