= William Davies (Georgia judge) =

American judge (1776–1829)

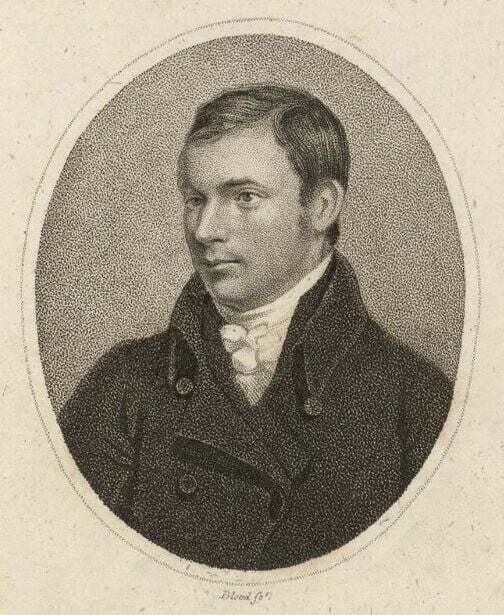

Member of the Georgia Senate from Chatham County
- In office 1828
- Preceded by: William C. Daniel
- Succeeded by: George Welshman Owens
- In office 1824–1825
- Preceded by: John M. Berrien
- Succeeded by: William C. Daniel

Judge of the United States District Court for the District of Georgia
- In office January 14, 1819 – March 9, 1821
- Appointed by: James Monroe
- Preceded by: William Stephens
- Succeeded by: Jeremiah La Touche Cuyler

10th mayor of Savannah, Georgia
- In office 1807–1807
- Preceded by: John Noel
- Succeeded by: Charles Harris

Personal details
- Born: William Davies; July 8, 1776 Savannah, Province of Georgia, British America
- Died: April 30, 1829 (aged 52) Savannah, Georgia
- Education: read law

William Davies (July 8, 1776 – April 30, 1829) was a United States district judge of the United States District Court for the District of Georgia.

== Education and career ==
Born on July 8, 1776, in Savannah, Province of Georgia, British America, Davies read law. He engaged in private practice in Savannah, Georgia until 1798, from 1798 to 1804, and from 1811 to 1814. He was a member of the Georgia House of Representatives in 1798, from 1807 to 1808, and in 1814. He was a member of the Georgia State Senate from 1809 to 1810. He was an alderman for Savannah from 1804 to 1808, from 1809 to 1811, and from 1815 to 1818. He was the Mayor of Savannah in 1807. He was United States Attorney for the District of Georgia until 1819.

== Federal judicial service ==
Davies was nominated by President James Monroe on January 11, 1819, to a seat on the United States District Court for the District of Georgia vacated by Judge William Stephens. He was confirmed by the United States Senate on January 11, 1819, and received his commission on January 14, 1819. His service terminated on March 9, 1821, due to his resignation.

== Later career and death ==
Following his resignation from the federal bench, Davies resumed private practice in Savannah from 1821 to 1822, and from 1825 to 1826. He was an alderman for Savannah from 1822 to 1823. He was again a member of the Georgia State Senate from 1824 to 1825, and in 1827. He was a Judge of the Superior Court of Georgia for the Eastern Judicial Circuit from 1828 to 1829. He died on April 30, 1829, in Savannah.

== Sources ==
Legal offices
Preceded by William Stephens	Judge of the United States District Court for the District of Georgia; 1819–1821	Succeeded by Jeremiah La Touche Cuyler
