= Samuel Stirk =

- Born: 1756
- Died: 1793 (aged 36–37)
- Occupation: Attorney

Samuel Stirk (1756 – 1793) was an English attorney from Savannah, Province of Georgia, in the 18th century. He was a lieutenant colonel of the Georgia Militia and a delegate to the Second Continental Congress. By the time of his death, aged 36 or 37, he was known as a "Georgian of distinction".

== Life and career ==
Stirk was born in England in 1756 to Nathan and Mary.

During the American Revolutionary War, he was lieutenant colonel in 1778. He was with Button Gwinnett in the "disastrous expedition against East Florida".

He was elected Attorney General of Georgia in January 1781. He served one term (four years).

In the late 18th century, Stirk taught law. One of his students was Charles Harris, a future mayor of Savannah.

Stirk was one of the seven first aldermen selected by the citizens of Savannah in March 1790.

== Death ==
Stirk died in 1793, aged 36 or 37. He is buried in Savannah's Catholic Cemetery.
