= 1845 Georgia gubernatorial election =

- October 6, 1845
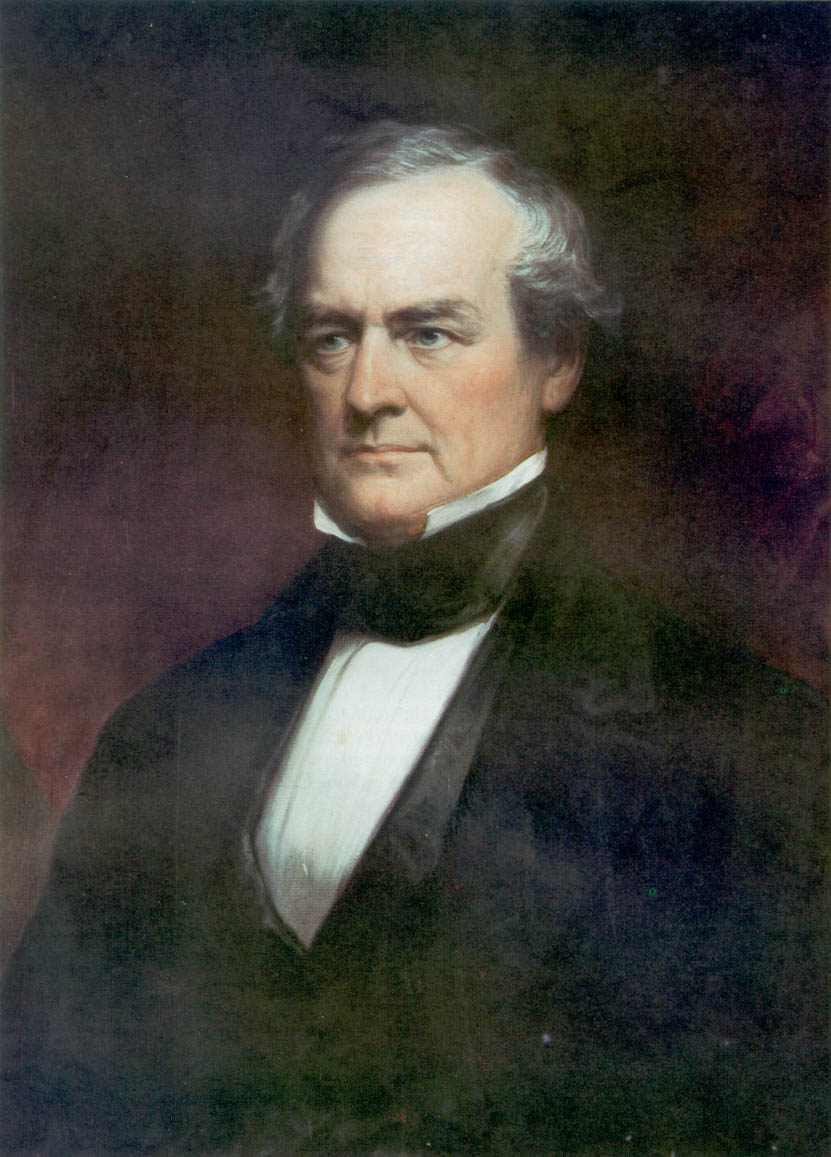

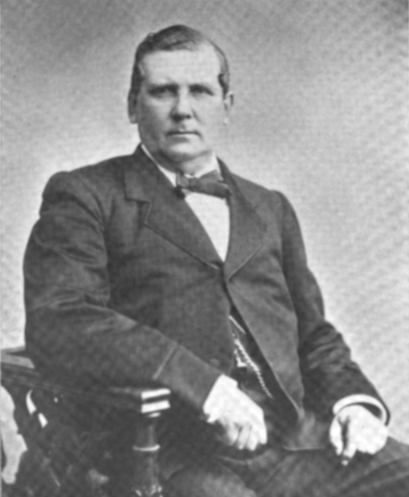
Nominee	George W. Crawford	Matthew Hall McAllister
Party	Whig	Democratic
Popular vote	41,514 (Note: Including returns from Dade and Lownde County that were not included in the official count.)	39,763
Percentage	51.08%	48.92%
- Results by County; Crawford: 50–60% 60–70% 70–80% 80–90% >90% McAllister: 50–60% 60–70% 70–80% 80–90% >90%
Governor before election
George W. Crawford
Whig
Elected Governor
George W. Crawford
Whig

The 1845 Georgia gubernatorial election was held on October 6, 1845, to elect the governor of Georgia. The incumbent governor, George W. Crawford, was re-elected to a second term in office.

== General election ==
=== Candidates ===
==== Whig ====
- George W. Crawford, incumbent governor.

==== Democratic ====
- Matthew Hall McAllister, former mayor of Savannah.

=== Results ===
1845 Georgia gubernatorial election
Party	Candidate	Votes	%	±%
Whig	George W. Crawford	41,514	51.08%	−1.12
Democratic	Matthew Hall McAllister	39,763	48.92%	+1.12
Total votes		81,277	100	
