= William Coffee Daniell =

American physician

- Born: 1792; Greene County, Georgia, U.S.
- Died: December 27, 1868 (aged 76); Liberty County, Georgia, U.S.
- Resting place: Laurel Grove Cemetery, Savannah, Georgia, U.S.

William Coffee Daniell (1792 – December 27, 1868) was an American medical doctor, planter and politician. He was mayor of Savannah, Georgia, for two years.

== Early life ==
A descendant of families from Virginia, Daniell was born near Greensboro, Georgia, in 1792 to Charles Daniell, a planter, and Elizabeth Coffee. He was educated at Willington Academy, in Willington, South Carolina, by Dr. Moses Waddel. He graduated from the University of Pennsylvania in 1814, having studied medicine under Dr. Watkins. He was also associated with Dr. Nathaniel Chapman.

== Career ==
In 1814, upon graduating medical school, Daniell opened a practice in Savannah, Georgia. Over the next two decades, he performed work on seasonal fevers which plagued the community.

Daniell was elected mayor of Savannah in 1824. He served one two-year term.

In 1827, he was Commissioner when the city was removing obstructions in the Savannah River. A project to build a dam between Hutchison Island and Fig Island, to facilitate the removal a large amount of ship wreckage, failed. Daniell was charged with fraud by the workers.

He began a medical practice in Savannah with Dr. James Proctor Screven in 1828. Screven left the practice two years later.

In 1830, Daniell was serving in the Georgia House of Representatives, a role in which he remained until 1833.

Upon the death of his first wife, Martha, from gastritis in 1834, Daniell left formal medical practice and lived on Whitemarsh Island.

In 1862, Literary Messenger published his article, "Southern Agricultural Congress". He was also a collaborator with the Philadelphia Journal of the Medical and Physical Sciences and had a stint as editor of the Savannah Republican.

Daniell was elected an honorary member of the Georgia Medical Society. He also served as first lieutenant with the Savannah Volunteer Guards. He was Receiver for the Southern District of Georgia during the Civil War.

=== Publications ===
In 1826, he published the 152-page Observations Upon the Autumnal Fevers in Savannah.

== Personal life ==
In 1819, Daniell successfully fought a bout of yellow fever.

Daniell married twice, both times to sisters of Screven: Martha from 1822 until her death in 1834, then Elizabeth from 1837 until his death. He lived with Elizabeth in Gainesville, Georgia, where he began planting. In 1846, he purchases Drakies Plantation from a John A. Fraser. He sold a tract each, for a loss, to John F. Tucker and John P. Keller during the economic depression of 1857.

Daniell had five children during his first marriage: Benjamin, Tatnall, Thomas, William and Marian. With his second wife, he had Charles and Sarah. Benjamin and Tattnall died within two months of each other, both in their 40s, a year before Daniell's death. He had earlier lost Thomas (aged 30) and William (aged 24 or 25).

Toward the end of his life, Daniell invest his funds in Confederate bonds, so much so that when General Lee surrendered, Daniell became penniless and was arrested. His county seat was lost and his rice plantations and mills were destroyed.

== Death ==
Daniell died "full of cares and debts" in 1868, aged 76. He was interred in Savannah's Laurel Grove Cemetery. His second wife survived him by eight years and was buried beside him. His first wife was interred in Colonial Park Cemetery, beside her father, John. It is not known where her mother, Hannah, is buried.

=== Legacy ===
In 2013, the Davenport House Museum in Savannah put on a play to portray Daniell's efforts to save humanity. It was titled Dreadful Pestilence: Savannah's Yellow Fever Epidemic of 1820.
