= John Screven =

- Born: September 18, 1827; Savannah, Georgia, U.S.
- Died: January 9, 1900 (aged 72); Savannah, Georgia, U.S.
- Resting place: Laurel Grove Cemetery, Savannah, Georgia, U.S.
- Spouse(s): Mary White Footman (until 1863; her death); Mary Eleanor Nesbit (until 1883; her death)
- Parent(s): James Proctor Screven; Hannah Georgia Bryan

John Bryan Screven (September 18, 1827 – January 9, 1900) was twice mayor of Savannah, Georgia, between 1869 and 1873.

== Early life ==
Screven was born in Savannah, Georgia, in 1827 to Dr. James Proctor Screven and Hannah Georgia Bryan. He was their first child, followed by Sarah (born 1831), Thomas (born 1834) and George (born 1839), and grew up on the Nonchalance estate on Wilmington Island.

== Career ==
Screven was a lawyer by education and served as a justice on the Inferior Court.

Upon the death of his father in 1859, he became president of the Atlantic and Gulf Railroad.

He served as captain of the Savannah Volunteer Guards, eventually becoming lieutenant-colonel in the defense of Savannah in 1864.

In 1869, he began a two-year term as the mayor of Savannah, serving until 1873.

He was president of the Georgia Historical Society, which was established in 1839, and of the Georgia Society of the Sons of the Revolution. He was vice-president of the General Society of the Sons of the Revolution.

== Personal life ==
Screven married twice: firstly, to Mary White Footman (who died in 1863), then to Mary Eleanor Nesbit. He had eight children: Georgia, Elizabeth, James, Thomas, Jonathan and Mary with Mary, and Leila and Martha with Mary.

He owned Montpelier, a plantation.

== Death ==
Screven died in 1900, aged 72. He was interred in Savannah's Laurel Grove Cemetery, alongside both of his wives, the second of whom he had survived by 17 years.
