= Charlton Street =

Prominent street in Savannah, Georgia, US

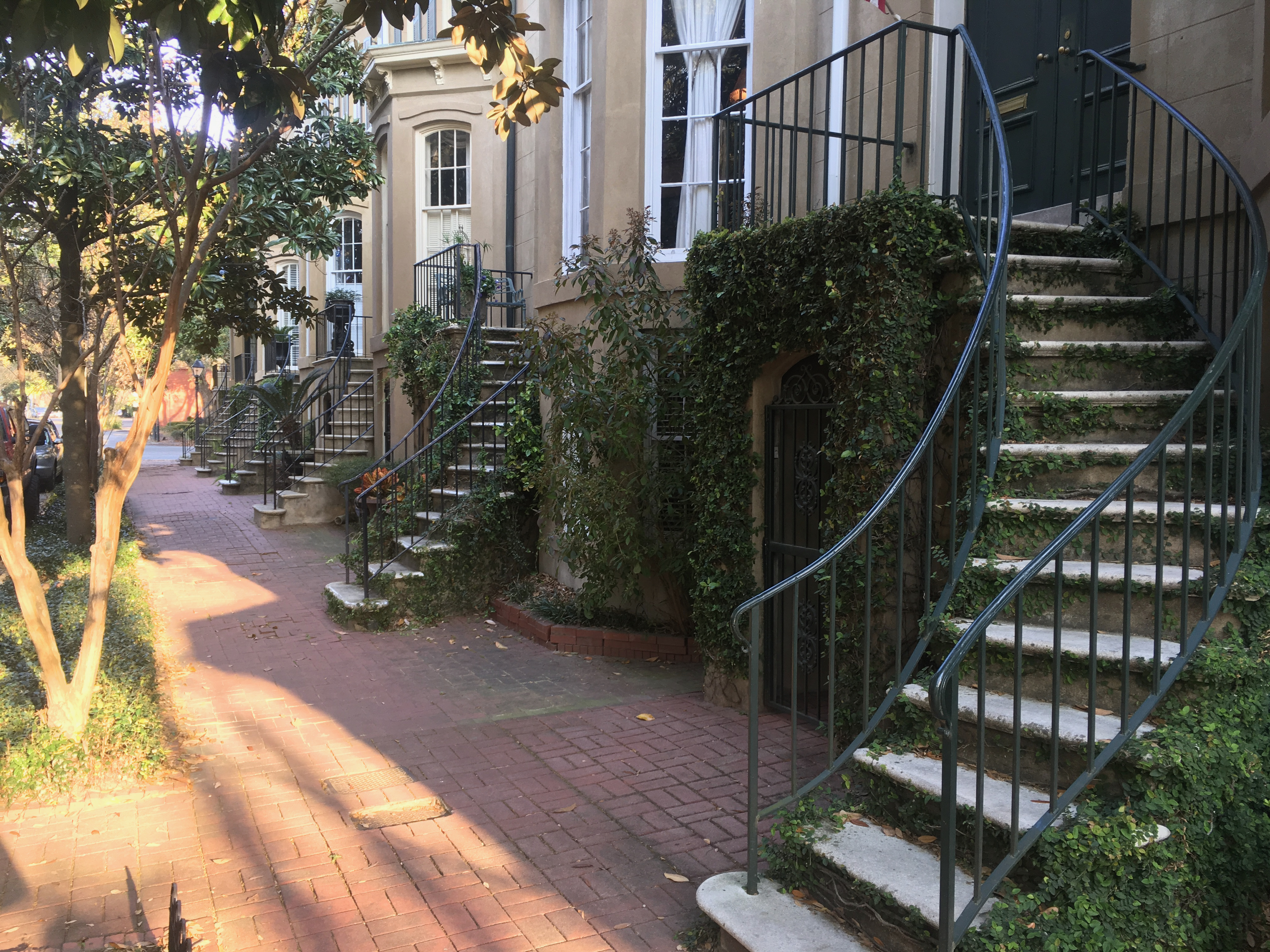
- Property frontages on East Charlton Street
- Namesake: Thomas Charlton
- Length: 0.86 mi (1.38 km)
- Location: Savannah, Georgia, U.S.
- West end: Purse Street
- East end: East Broad Street

Charlton Street is a prominent street in Savannah, Georgia, United States. Located between Harris Street to the north and Jones Street to the south, it runs for about 0.86 miles (1.38 km) from Purse Street in the west to East Broad Street in the east. Originally known only as Charlton Street singular, its addresses are now split between "West Charlton Street" and "East Charlton Street", the transition occurring at Bull Street in the center of the downtown area. The street is named for Thomas Charlton, fifteenth mayor of Savannah.

The street is entirely within Savannah Historic District, a National Historic Landmark District.

Charlton Street passes through four squares on their southern side. From west to east:

- Pulaski Square
- Madison Square
- Lafayette Square
- Troup Square

== Notable buildings and structures ==
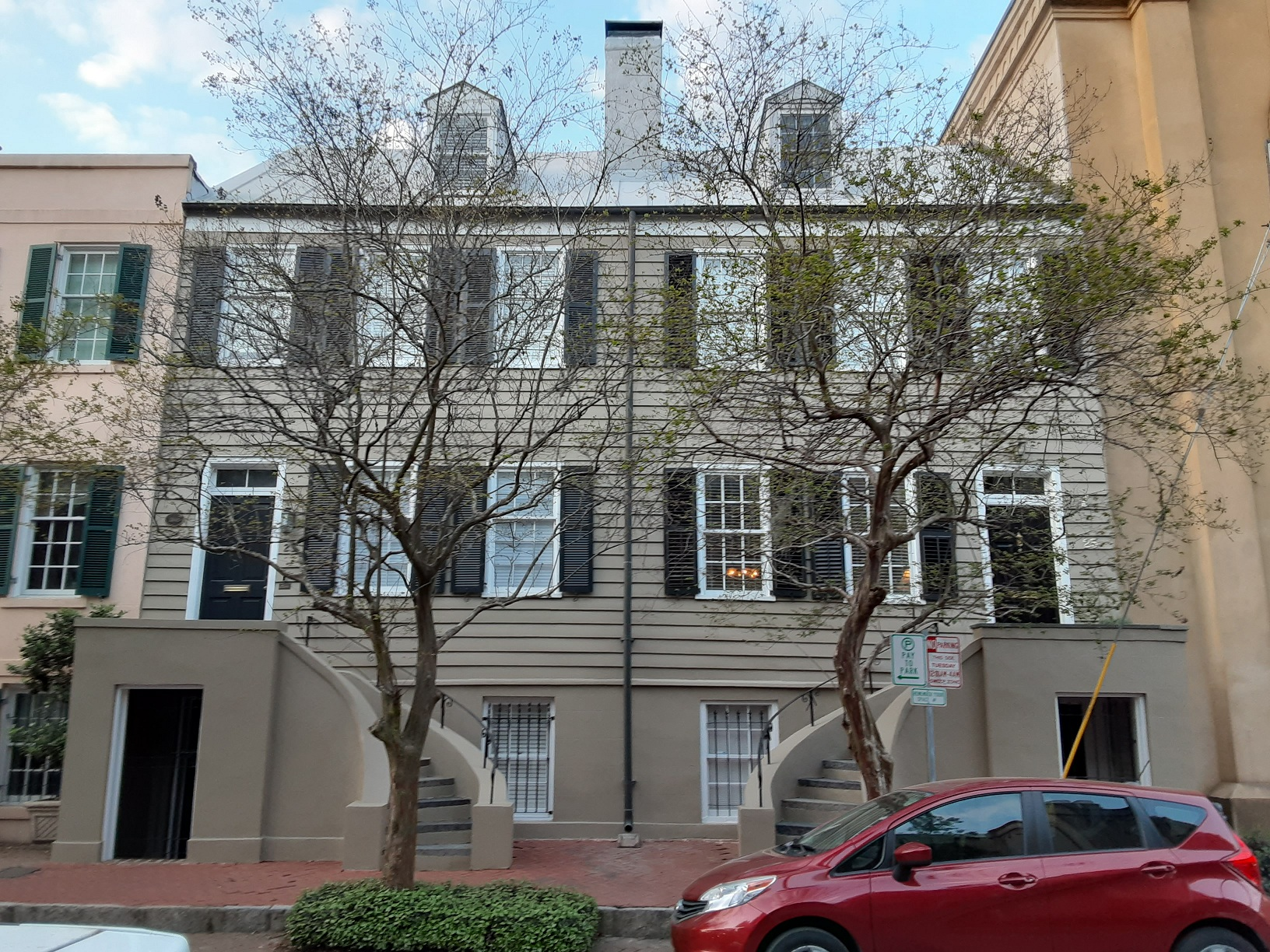
Daniel Robertson Property, 23–25 West Charlton Street

Below is a selection of notable buildings and structures on Charlton Street, all in Savannah's Historic District. From west to east:

West Charlton Street

- Moses Cohen House, 215 West Charlton Street (1846)
- Celia Solomons, 201–203 West Charlton Street (1854–1856)
- William Adams House, 123 West Charlton Street (1843)
- George Walker House, 117 West Charlton Street (1904)
- Hill Gordy House, 111 West Charlton Street (1864–1865)
- 109 West Charlton Street (1915)
- Daniel Robertson Property (I), 23–25 West Charlton Street (1845)
- Daniel Robertson Property (II), 19 West Charlton Street (1857)
- Daniel Robertson Property (III), 11–17 West Charlton Street (1852–1853)
- Daniel Purse Row House, 5–9 West Charlton Street (1879)

East Charlton Street

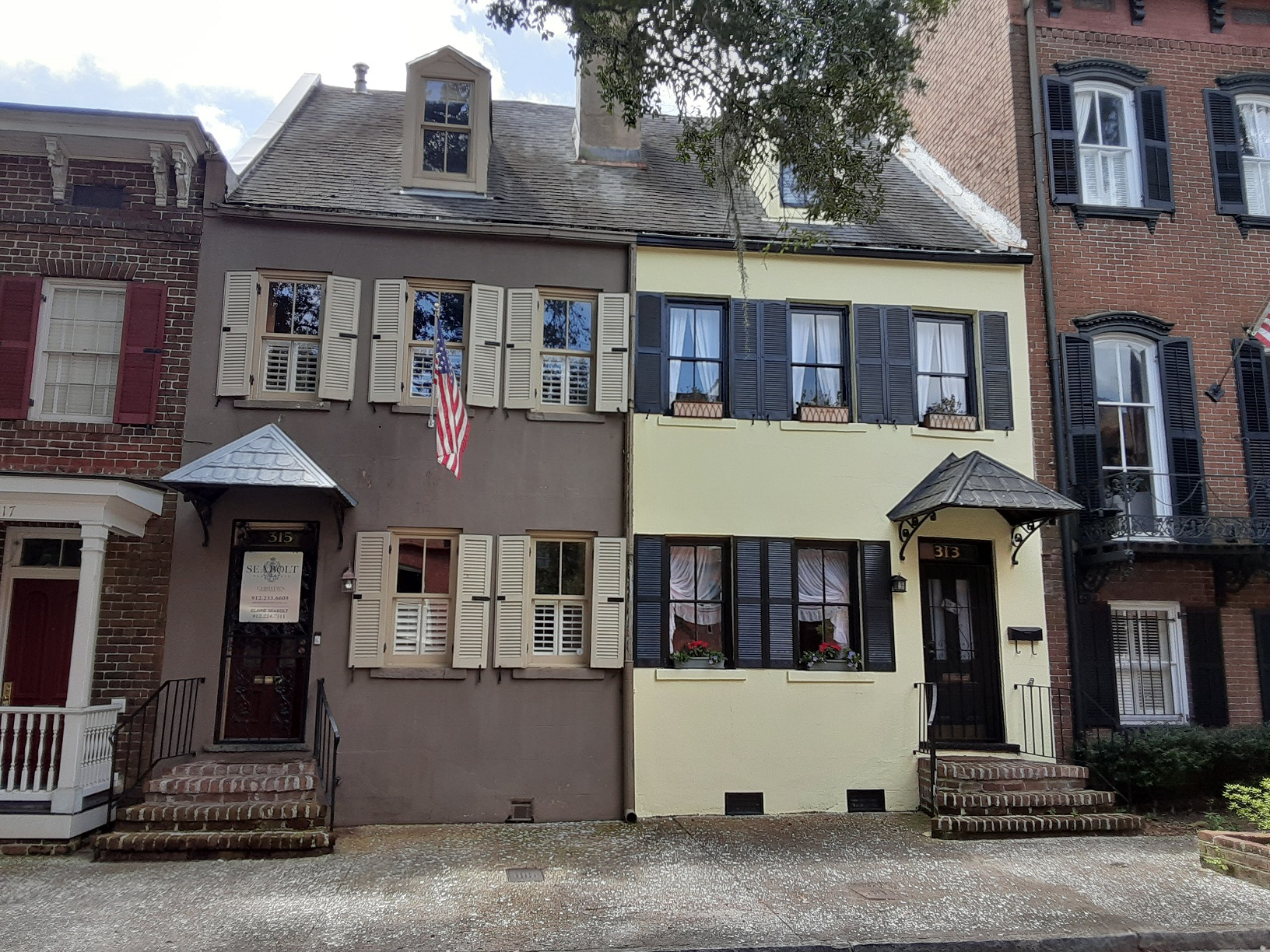
Lewis Cook Duplex, 313–315 East Charlton Street

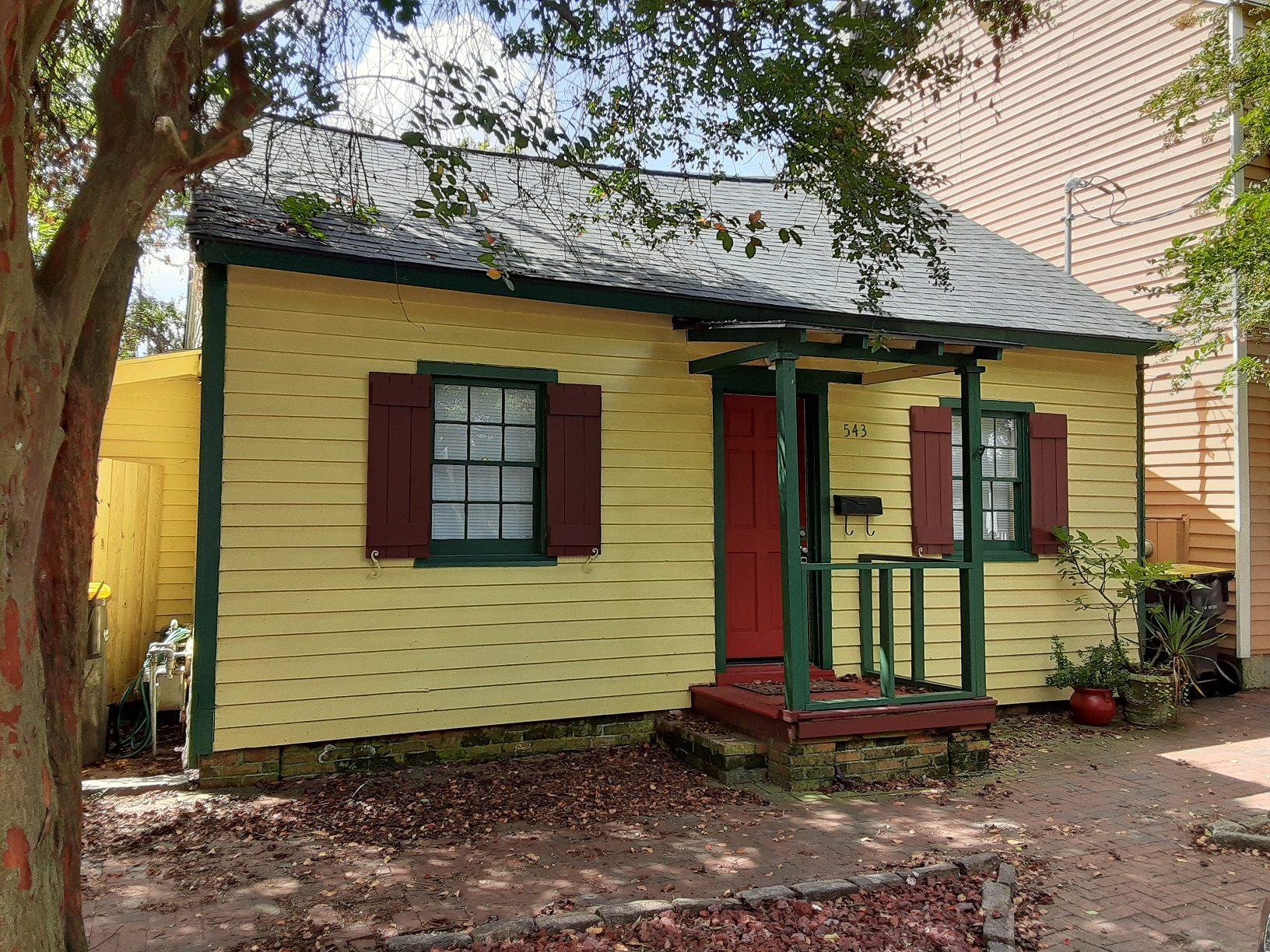
James Cann Property, 543 East Charlton Street

- Battersby–Hartridge–Anderson House, 119 East Charlton Street (1852)
- John B. Gallie House, 201–203 East Charlton Street (1858)
- Flannery O'Connor Childhood Home, 207 East Charlton Street (1856)
- Catherine McMahon House, 211 East Charlton Street (1853)
- Fitzgerald Pelot Duplex, 221–223 East Charlton Street (1854–1855)
- Charles Lampe Duplex, 301–305 East Charlton Street (1855)
- Mary Edmundson House, 311 Charlton Street (1873)
- Lewis Cook Duplex, 313–315 East Charlton Street (1852–1853)
- Michael McQuade, 317 East Charlton Street (1883)
- John Kenney House, 319 East Charlton Street (1870)
- Mortimer Williams House, 401 East Charlton Street (1860)
- Dale Row, 405–411 East Charlton Street (1882)
- McDonough Row, 410–424 East Charlton Street (1882)
- George Haslam House, 417 East Charlton Street (1872)
- Henry Bragdon–Edward Segur Duplex, 419–421 East Charlton Street (1868)
- Ellen Williams House, 423 East Charlton Street (1867)
- Noble Hardee & E. D. Myers Duplex, 501–503 East Charlton Street (1853)
- Samuel Garey Property, 509 East Charlton Street (1860)
- Lucy Sabttie Property, 511 East Charlton Street (1865)
- Prince Rogers Property, 537–539 East Charlton Street (1869)
- James Cann Property, 543 East Charlton Street (1866)
