= Peter Roe Nugent =

American politician

Georgia Ports Authority
- In office 1949–1955
- Appointed by: Herman Talmadge

55th Mayor of Savannah, Georgia
- In office 1945–1947
- Preceded by: Thomas Gamble
- Succeeded by: John G. Kennedy

Personal details
- Born: 1893 Savannah, Georgia
- Died: September 24, 1975 (aged 81–82)
- Party: Democratic
- Spouse: Mary Louise Lynch
- Children: 4
- Parents: Thomas Nugent (father); Nellie Roe Nugent (mother)
- Education: B.A. Georgia Institute of Technology
- Occupation: Baker

Peter Roe Nugent (1893–September 24, 1975) was an American politician who served as mayor of Savannah, Georgia and as vice-chairman and pioneer member of the Georgia Ports Authority.

== Biography ==
Nugent was born to a prominent Catholic family in Savannah in 1893, the son of Nellie Roe and Thomas Nugent. His father was an immigrant from Australia and his mother a Savannah native. He graduated from the Benedictine Military School and Georgia Institute of Technology. In 1915, he and his father started a bakery of which he became the proprietor. His sister, Helen Roe Nugent, served as president of the Savannah-Atlanta Diocesan Council of the National Council of Catholic Women. In 1937, he was elected to the City Council of Savannah. On November 4, 1942, he was named vice-chairman of the City Council after Harry B. Grimshaw was named chairman; and on January 22, 1945, he was named chairman. On July 25, 1945, he was elected mayor by the City Council upon the untimely death of mayor Thomas Gamble.

While in office, Nugent was dedicated to developing the paper industry in the region, lead a campaign to test all 125,000 residents of the county for tuberculosis and syphilis in order to treat and eradicate the diseases, presided over a state visit by Winston Churchill, conducted a major cleanup of the city after criticism from Lady Nancy Astor that Savannah was "like a beautiful woman with a dirty face" (she later apologized), and secured the establishment of a Savannah branch for Georgia State University (to serve freshman and sophomores).

He declined to enter the race for mayor after the end of his term on January 27, 1947. The Democratic nominee for mayor was John G. Kennedy, of the Citizen's Progressive League which had been in opposition to his administration. Kennedy was the only candidate on the ballot in the general election although he accused unnamed members of the outgoing Nugant administration of illegally inserting 15–20,000 stick-in ballots for pasting on the general ballot. Kennedy won in a landslide and the entire City Council was replaced. From 1949 to 1955, he again served as chairman of the City Council during the administration of mayor Olin F. Fulmer and helped to facilitate the exchange of Savannah-owned Hunter Field for the Chatham Air Force Base. In 1949, he was appointed by Governor Herman Talmadge to the 3-member Georgia Ports Authority and was soon after named vice-chairman. In 1950, Nugent helped to secure a $4,500,000 loan from the Reconstruction Finance Corporation for Port of Savannah expansion. He resigned from the Port Authority in 1955.

Nugent was a former president of the Hibernian Society, the Chamber of Commerce, the Southern Baker's Association, and the Chatham County Board of Education.

== Personal life ==
Lynch married Mary Louise Lynch of Savannah; they had four children: Mrs. J H. Clancy Jr., John Nugent, Thomas Nugent, and Mary Roe Nugent.
