= Lucy Barrow McIntire =

American suffragist

- Born: Lucy Barrow McIntire; July 11, 1886; Athens, Georgia, U.S.
- Died: November 4, 1967 (aged 81)
- Resting place: Laurel Grove Cemetery
- Spouse: Francis "Frank" Percival McIntire
- Children: 6

Lucy Barrow McIntire (July 11, 1886 – November 4, 1967), also called Miss Lucy, was an American suffragist, activist, preservationist, actress, and poet.

== Early life ==
Lucy Barrow Davenport was born in Athens, Georgia, on July 11, 1886, to the prominent Davenport family. She married attorney Francis Percival McIntire; the couple moved to Francis' hometown of Savannah and had six children. The oldest, James William, was born in 1910; Francis Jr. on July 19, 1921; and the youngest, Pope, was born in 1924.

== Social and volunteer work ==
While living in Savannah, McIntire co-founded local chapters of the Junior League of Savannah and the League of Women Voters; she was the first president of the Junior League of Savannah, and also served as president of both the Georgia Federation of Women's Clubs and the Savannah Suffrage Association.

McIntire helped to establish a free lunch program within the Chatham County School District, and she was the first woman to serve on Savannah's Metropolitan Planning Commission.

Following her work supporting presidential candidate Woodrow Wilson, McIntire was appointed the first Georgia Committeewoman on the Democratic National Committee. During the 1930s, she served as a field supervisor for the Works Progress Administration, and after the outbreak of World War II she worked as a service director for the American Red Cross and founded the U.S.O.–Soldiers Social Service of Savannah.

McIntire was involved with the conversion of the Isaiah Davenport House into a museum; she is Isiah Davenport's great-great-great-granddaughter. McIntire cut the ribbon at the museum's official opening ceremony on March 9, 1963.

=== Other organizations co-founded ===
- Chatham Nursing Home
- Historic Savannah Foundation (1955)
- Juvenile Protection Association
- Savannah Country Day School
- Savannah Health Center
- Savannah Nursery School
- Savannah's Christmas Stocking
- Women's Relief Committee

== Personal interests ==
McIntire was involved in amateur theatre. In 1928, the Town Theatre in Savannah held a contest for the best one-act play; the winner was The Hero, written by Frances Hargis, in which McIntire portrayed the widowed daughter of a Civil War veteran. Her son was played by Johnny Mercer, whom she "advised ... to give songwriting and acting a try". The production traveled to New York City to compete in the Belasco Theatre's sixth annual tournament, performing in both the Frolic Theatre (May 11, 1928) and the old New Amsterdam Theatre before placing second.

McIntire also helped found the Georgia Poetry Society and won prizes for her own work.

Regarding her work with Historic Savannah Association, McIntire wrote that Savannah was "one of the most beautiful cities and unique in the United States", lamenting that "[y]ear after year architecturally beautiful homes and historic structures were going down".

== Death and legacy ==
The city of Savannah named McIntire Woman of the Year in 1955. In 1958, she received the Groves Award and the Oglethorpe Trophy for her preservation work.

McIntire died on November 4, 1967, in Savannah, Georgia. She is buried at Laurel Grove Cemetery.

She was inducted into the Georgia Women of Achievement Hall of Fame in 1997.

McIntire is a character in Michael Ching's 2017 opera Anna Hunter, the Spirit of Savannah, which premiered in Savannah; the role was originated by Legera Danielides.

== Poetry ==
- McIntire, Lucy Barrow (1923). Three Islands. Poetry Society of Georgia. OCLC 1843623.
