= Matthew McAllister =

American politician

United States Attorney for the Southern District of Georgia
- In office 1789–1797
- Appointed by: George Washington
- Preceded by: None
- Succeeded by: Charles Jackson

7th Mayor of Savannah, Georgia
- In office 1798–1799
- Preceded by: John Glen
- Succeeded by: Thomas Gibbons
- In office 1814–1815
- Preceded by: George Jones
- Succeeded by: Thomas Charlton

Personal details
- Born: Matthew McAllister; May 4, 1758 York County, Pennsylvania
- Died: May 9, 1823 (aged 65)
- Party: Federalist; Democratic-Republican
- Parent: Robert McAllister

Matthew McAllister (May 4, 1758 – May 9, 1823) was an American politician who served as the first United States Attorney for the Southern District of Georgia (1789–1797) and Mayor of Savannah, Georgia (1798–1799 and 1814–1815).

== Biography ==
He was born on May 4, 1758 in York County, Pennsylvania, the 5th child of Colonel Robert McAllister who founded the town of Hanover, Pennsylvania. In 1784, after graduating from Princeton, he moved to Savannah, Georgia where he practiced law. In 1789, he was named by George Washington as the first United States Attorney for the Southern District of Georgia; he served until 1797 when he was replaced by Charles Jackson. He ran for Georgia's 1st congressional district in 1792 as a Federalist. He was linked to the Yazoo Land Fraud of 1795 and came under scathing criticism from the state's leading Republican, James Jackson which impacted his career. He later served in the Georgia Legislature and as mayor of Savannah from 1798 to 1799 and again during the War of 1812 from 1814 to 1815. He did not receive an appointment during Thomas Jefferson's administration (1801–1809).

He married Hannah Gibbons, sister of William Gibbons. They had two children, Harriet, who died in infancy, and Judge Matthew Hall McAllister. He died on May 9, 1823.
