= Richard Wayne =

American politician

Dr. Richard Wayne (April 4, 1804 – June 27, 1858) served four non-consecutive terms as mayor of Savannah, Georgia: 1844–1845, 1848–1851, 1852–1853 and 1857–1858. He died while in office.

Wayne was the first mayor of Savannah elected by its citizens. Prior to his election, mayors were appointed by the city aldermen. He is buried in Savannah's Laurel Grove Cemetery.

Political offices
| Preceded by William Thorne Williams | Mayor of Savannah; 1844-1845 | Succeeded by Henry Burroughs |
| Preceded by Henry Burroughs | Mayor of Savannah; 1848-1851 | Succeeded by Richard Arnold |
| Preceded by Richard Arnold | Mayor of Savannah; 1852-1853 | Succeeded by John Ward |
| Preceded by James Proctor Screven | Mayor of Savannah; 1857-1858 | Succeeded by Thomas Turner |
