= William Richard Waring =

American physician (1787–1843)

- Born: July 4, 1787; South Carolina, U.S.
- Died: January 2, 1843 (aged 55); Savannah, Georgia, U.S.
- Resting place: Laurel Grove Cemetery, Savannah, Georgia, U.S.
- Occupation: Physician
- Spouse: Anne Johnston (1825–1836; her death)
- Relatives: Waring family

William Richard Waring (July 4, 1787 – January 2, 1843) was a 19th-century American medical doctor. He was described as one of the "most illustrious physicians" in Savannah, Georgia. The William Waring Property, the oldest extant building in that city's Wright Square, is now named for him.

He server two terms as mayor of Savannah (1830–1832).

His son was fellow physician James Johnston Waring.

== Life and career ==
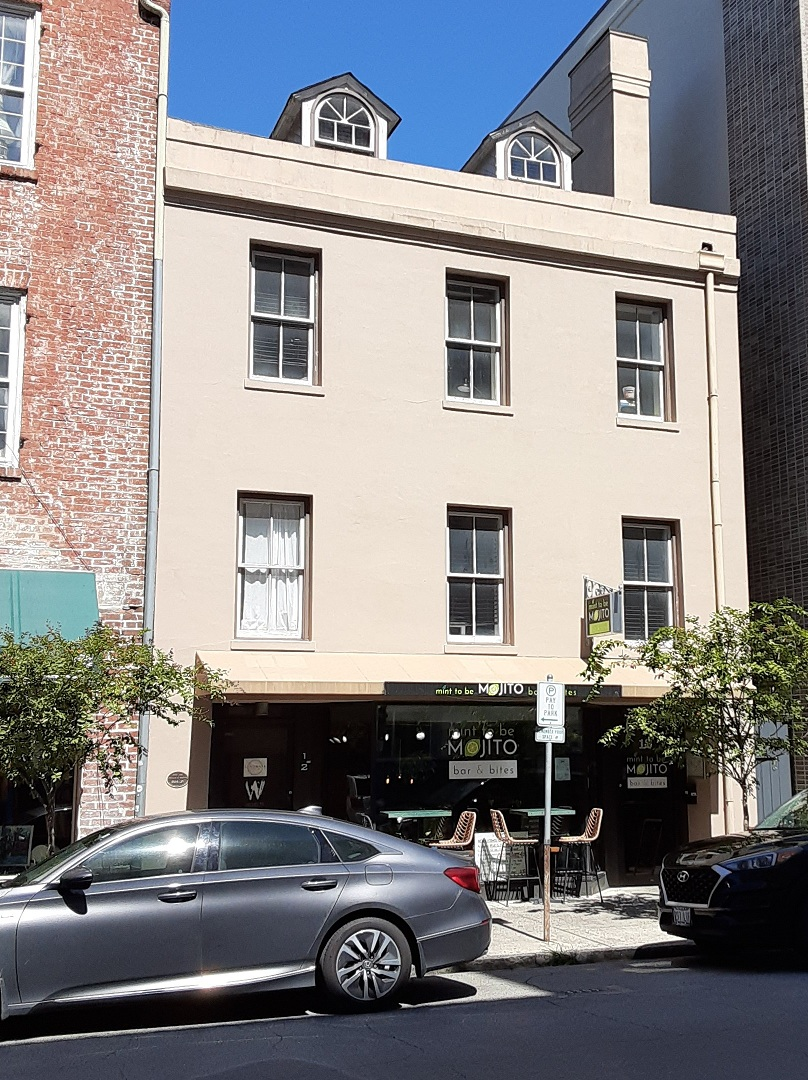
12 West State Street in Savannah, Georgia, Waring's family home

Waring was born in 1787 in South Carolina. His father was William Waring Sr. He graduated South Carolina College in 1808, later studying medicine in Charleston, South Carolina.

After further studies at the University of Pennsylvania (graduating in 1813), he served during the War of 1812 as surgeon of the 8th Regiment Infantry, stationed in Savannah, Georgia. He remained in the city for the rest of his life, initially living at 12 West State Street, which was built in 1825.

In 1821, he wrote Report to the City Council of Savannah on the Epidemic Disease of 1820.

In 1825, he married Anne Johnston, with whom he had four known children: William (born 1827), James (1829), George (1833) and Anna Mary (1836).

As his family expanded, Waring purchased a home at 121–123 West Oglethorpe Avenue in 1832, toward the end of his stints as mayor of Savannah.

Waring was an 1833 co-founder of Savannah's Temperance Society.

== Death ==
Waring died in 1843, aged 55. He was interred beside his wife, who preceded him in death by seven years, in Savannah's Laurel Grove Cemetery.

== Bibliography ==
- Report to the City Council of Savannah on the Epidemic Disease of 1820 (1821)
