= Richard Dennis Arnold =

American physician and public servant

- Born: August 19, 1808; Savannah, Georgia, U.S.
- Died: July 10, 1876 (aged 67); Savannah, Georgia, U.S.
- Resting place: Bonaventure Cemetery, Savannah, Georgia, U.S.
- Occupation: Physician
- Spouse: Elizabeth Baugh Stirk (–1850; her death)

Richard Dennis Arnold (August 19, 1808 – July 10, 1876) was an American medical doctor and public servant in Savannah, Georgia, United States. He was the city's mayor for four terms, and was in office during General William Tecumseh Sherman's "March to the Sea". He convinced Sherman to spare Savannah by surrendering the city to President Abraham Lincoln.

== Early life ==
Arnold was born in 1808 in Savannah, Georgia, to Captain Richard Arnold and Eliza Dennis.

He graduated from the College of New Jersey, before attaining an M.D. from University of Pennsylvania Medical School in 1830.

== Career ==
Arnold was a co-founder of the Georgia Historical Society (1839), the American Medical Association (1847; becoming its vice-president in 1851), the Georgia Medical Society and Savannah Medical College (1850). He taught at the college.

He served in the Georgia Senate, defeating General Francis S. Bartow in 1842.

In 1833, he began publishing the Daily Georgian with W. H. Bullock, a role which lasted for a year. In 1835, he was a physician at the Savannah poorhouse and hospital. He remained in the role for the next two decades.

He was mayor of Savannah on four occasions, including when William Tecumseh Sherman invaded the city. Arnold surrendered the city to Sherman, to avoid the general burning it during his 1864 March to the Sea.

== Personal life ==
Arnold married Elizabeth Baugh Stirk.

== Death ==
Arnold died of tuberculosis in 1876, aged 67, in the same room in which he was born. He had survived his wife by 26 years, and was buried beside her in Savannah's Bonaventure Cemetery.
