= Thomas Gamble (mayor) =

American historian and politician

Thomas Gamble Jr.

Mayor of Savannah
- In office 1939–1945
- Preceded by: Robert M. Hitch
- Succeeded by: Peter Roe Nugent

Mayor of Savannah
- In office 1933–1937
- Preceded by: Thomas Hoynes
- Succeeded by: Robert M. Hitch

Personal details
- Born: 1868 Richmond, Virginia
- Died: July 13, 1945 (age 77) Signal Mountain, Tennessee
- Party: Democratic

Thomas Gamble Jr. (March 16, 1868 – July 13, 1945) was an American historian and a politician from Georgia, United States. He was Mayor of Savannah and was a Democrat.

== Background ==
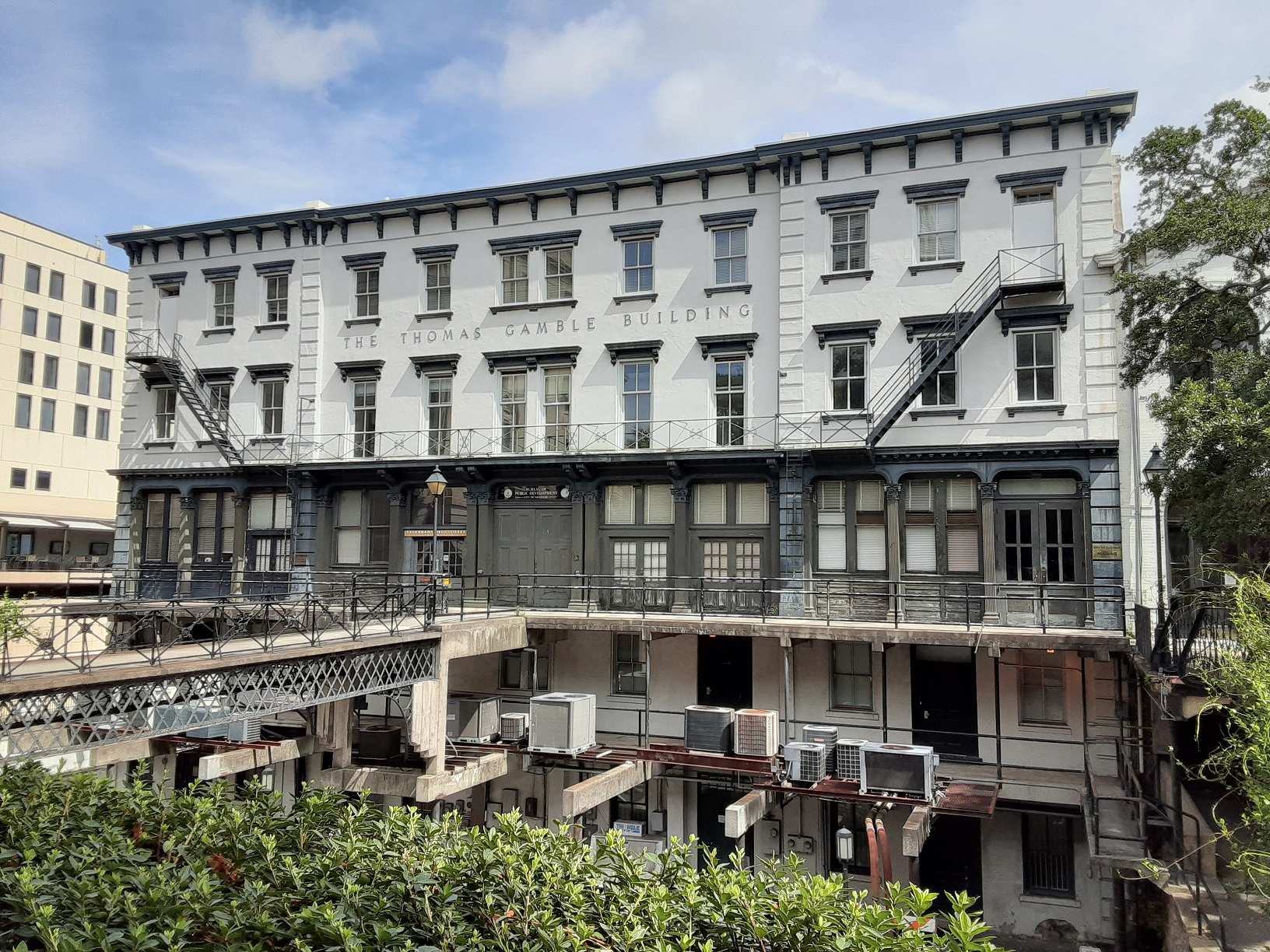
The Thomas Gamble Building on Savannah's East Bay Street, named for the mayor upon his death

Thomas Gamble who was a Newspaperman, six-term Mayor of Savannah, Mayor of Savannah Beach, Historical Researcher and Writer, the father of Armstrong Junior College, a Publisher, a Husband, a Father, a decorated Chevalier Cross of the Order of Polonia Restituta, a recipient of a bronze medallion from the LS. Pulaski Sesqui-centennlal commission, a recipient of the Lucas Cup trophy and member of various other notable civic and social societies, commissions and boards. He was born in Richmond, Virginia in 1868 and died in 1945 after adopting Savannah as his home in 1888. He published a number of history books, including A History of the City Government of Savannah, Ga. (1901) and Savannah's Duels and Duelists, (1927).

== Political career ==
Gamble served as Mayor of Tybee Beach and Secretary to the Mayor of Savannah, until he became Savannah's chief executive. He ran for Mayor of Savannah in 1932 and won the election. He took office in early 1933 and was re-elected in 1934, serving until 1937. He did not run for re-election in 1936, but was returned to office in 1938 and was re-elected in 1940, 1942 and 1944.

== Death ==
Gamble died in office at Signal Mountain, Tennessee, on July 13, 1945 of coronary thrombosis at the age of 77. He was succeeded by Peter Roe Nugent.

== Footnotes ==
Political offices
Preceded by Thomas Hoynes, Democrat	Mayor of Savannah; 1933-1937	Succeeded by Robert M. Hitch, Democrat
Preceded by Robert M. Hitch, Democrat	Mayor of Savannah; 1939-1945	Succeeded by Peter Roe Nugent, Democrat
