= Gibbons Mansion =

- Mead Hall
- U.S. National Register of Historic Places
- New Jersey Register of Historic Places
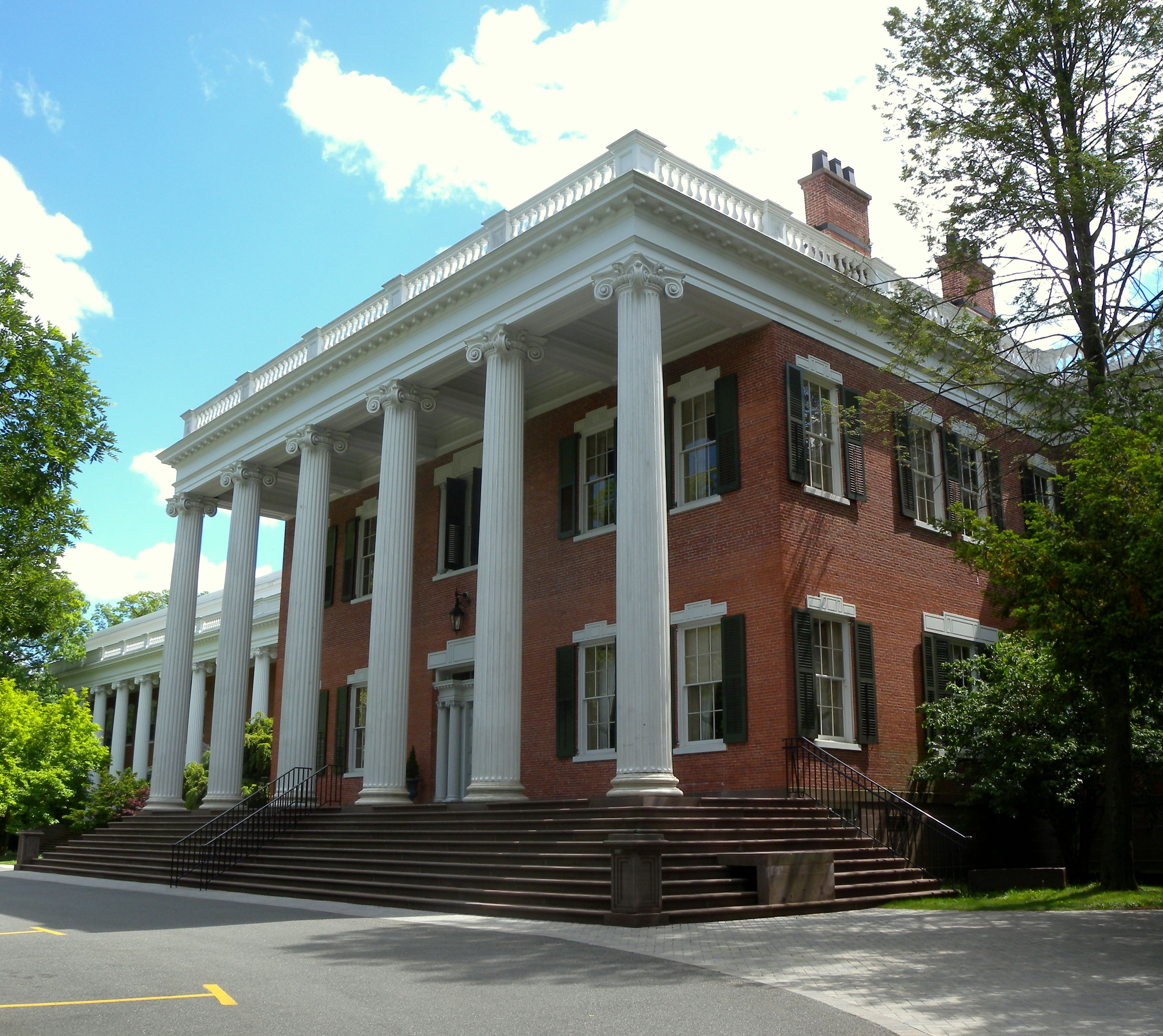

- Location within Morris County, New Jersey Location within New Jersey Location within the United States
- Location: 36 Madison Avenue, Drew University, Madison, New Jersey, U.S.
- Coordinates: 40.76125°N 74.42526°W
- Built: 1836
- Architectural style: Greek revival
- NRHP reference No.: 77000897
- NJRHP No.: 4433

Significant dates
- Added to NRHP: August 10, 1977
- Designated NJRHP: December 1, 1976

Gibbons Mansion, currently known as Mead Hall, is a historical mansion on Drew University campus in Madison, Morris County, New Jersey, United States. It houses the university's administrative offices today.

== History ==
The mansion was built by William Gibbons beginning in 1833 in the heart of his 96-acre property; it was first occupied in 1836. Gibbons was the son of Thomas Gibbons, a prominent politician, lawyer and steamboat operator originally from the South.

In 1867, Gibbons’ only son, William Heyward Gibbons, sold the vacant mansion and estate to Daniel Drew for $140,000. Drew, in turn, the Drew Theological Seminary, named in his honor. The Gibbons mansion was renamed Mead Hall, in honor of Drew's wife, Roxanna Mead. The sister of William Heyward Gibbons, Sarah Taintor Gibbons, was Mrs. Ward McAllister.

=== 1989 fire ===
Mead Hall was devastated by a fire in 1989, reopened in 1993, and despite the damage, is still “considered the finest example of Greek Revival architecture north of the Mason–Dixon line."

== See also ==
- Drew University
