= Robert M. Charlton =

American politician

Robert Milledge Charlton
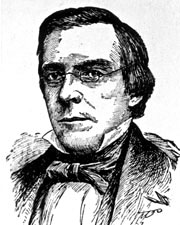

United States Senator from Georgia
- In office May 31, 1852 – March 3, 1853
- Preceded by: John M. Berrien
- Succeeded by: Robert Toombs

27th mayor of Savannah, Georgia
- In office 1839–1841
- Preceded by: Matthew Hall McAllister
- Succeeded by: William Thorne Williams

Member of the Georgia House of Representatives
- In office 1828

Personal details
- Born: January 19, 1807 Savannah, Georgia
- Died: January 18, 1854 (aged 46) Savannah, Georgia
- Resting place: Laurel Grove Cemetery
- Party: Democratic

Robert Milledge Charlton (January 19, 1807 – January 18, 1854) was an American politician and jurist. He served as a Senator representing Georgia from 1852 to 1853.

Charlton was born in Savannah, Georgia, on January 19, 1807, to Thomas Charlton, future two-time mayor of Savannah, and Emily Walter. His mother died before he reached the age of two. A lawyer by training, Charlton served in various positions at the city and state level in addition to his U.S. Senate term. He was a member of the Georgia House of Representatives (1828), and he was appointed and subsequently elected a judge of the Eastern Circuit of Georgia in 1832. Charlton was also appointed as a United States District Attorney.

He was appointed as a Democrat to the United States Senate to fill the vacancy caused by the resignation of John M. Berrien. Charlton had previously served as the mayor of Savannah from 1839 to 1841. Charlton's father, Thomas Usher Pulaski Charlton, had previously served as the appointed mayor of Savannah in 1815 and again in 1819.

In 1829, Robert Charlton married Margaret Shick. Charlton ward, Savannah and Charlton County, Georgia are named after him. Charlton died in Savannah on January 18, 1854, aged 46, and is buried in Laurel Grove Cemetery in that city.

He was also a slave owner. In 1830, he owned three slaves. In 1840, he owned fourteen. In 1850, he owned thirteen.

Charlton's great-great grandson was Savannah preservationist Walter Hartridge.

U.S. Senate
Preceded by John MacPherson Berrien	U.S. senator (Class 2) from Georgia; May 31, 1852 – March 3, 1853; Served alongside: William C. Dawson	Succeeded by Robert Toombs
