= William Waring Property =

Historic house in Savannah, Georgia

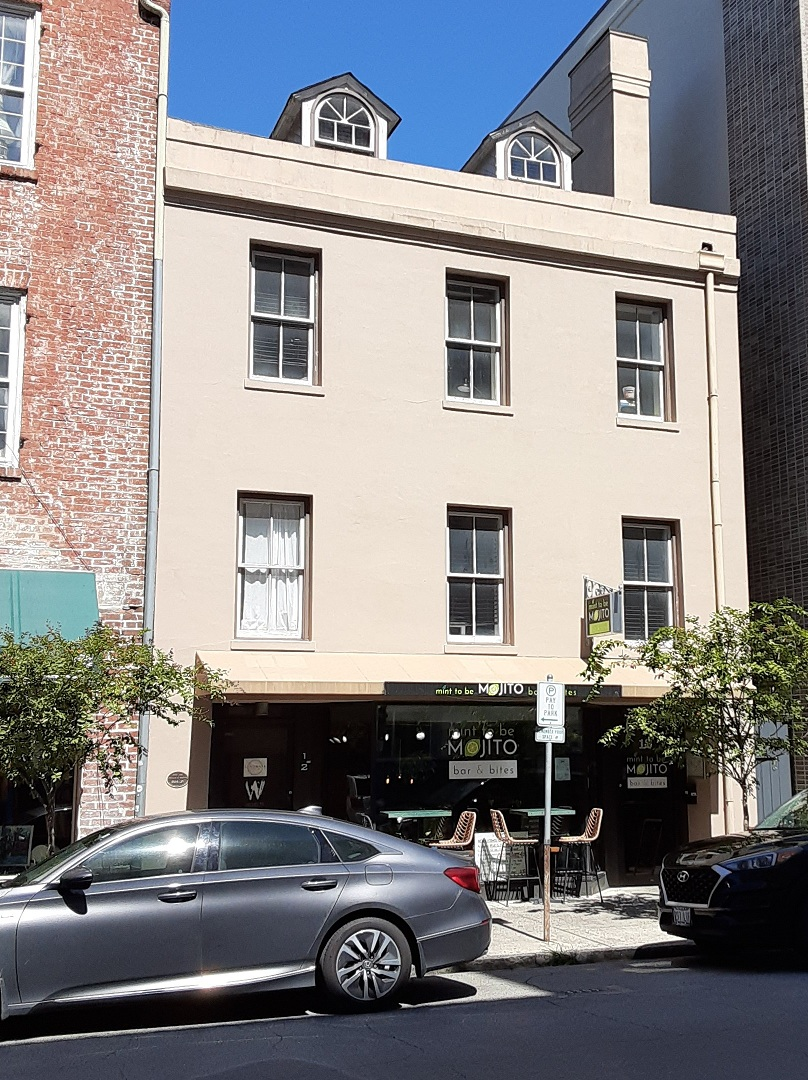
- The building in 2021
- Interactive map of the William Waring Property area

General information
- Location: Savannah, Georgia, U.S., 12 West State Street
- Coordinates: 32.078600367°N 81.0927749°W
- Completed: 1825 (201 years ago)

Technical details
- Floor count: 2.5

The William Waring Property is a historic building in Savannah, Georgia, United States. Located in the northwestern residential block of Wright Square, at 12 West State Street, it dates to 1825, making it the oldest extant building on the square. It was built for Dr. William R. Waring, a prominent Savannah physician.

In a survey for the Historic Savannah Foundation, Mary Lane Morrison found the building to be of significant status.

== See also ==
- Buildings in Savannah Historic District
