= Joseph Gaston Baillie Bulloch =

American historian (1852–1934)

- Born: October 12, 1852; Roswell, Georgia, U.S.
- Died: 1934 (aged 81 or 82)
- Resting place: Rock Creek Cemetery, Washington, D.C., U.S.
- Occupations: Physician, historian, genealogist
- Spouse: Eunice Helena Bailey (m. 1880–1926; her death)

Joseph Gaston Baillie Bulloch (October 12, 1852 – 1934) was an American physician, historian and genealogist. His 1915 publication, The Lineage Book of the Order of Washington, is in the Smithsonian Libraries.

== Life and career ==
Bulloch was born in 1852 in Roswell, Georgia, to Dr. William Gaston Bulloch and Mary Eliza Adams Lewis. He graduated from the Medical College of South Carolina, in Charleston, in 1877.

Bulloch was written to several times by U.S. President Theodore Roosevelt, a member of the Bulloch family through his mother, Martha Bulloch Roosevelt. In 1911, Roosevelt submitted a subscription for four volumes of History and Genealogy of the Families of Bulloch and Stobo, which he was in the process of writing, albeit at Bulloch's request. Bulloch had previously written another history and genealogy of the Habersham family in 1901.

In 1897, Bulloch was offered a position as a physician at the Indian Boarding School in Oneida, Wisconsin.

== Personal life ==
In 1880, Bulloch married Eunice Helena Bailey, with whom he had three children: sons William, Douglass and Archibald.

Bulloch was living at The Octavia, 1669 Columbia Road in Washington, D.C., by 1926.

== Death ==
Bulloch died in 1934, aged 81 or 82. He was interred in Rock Creek Cemetery in Washington, D.C., alongside his wife, who predeceased him by eight years.
