= James Proctor Screven =

American physician

- Born: October 15, 1799
- Died: July 10, 1859 (aged 59)
- Resting place: Laurel Grove Cemetery, Savannah, Georgia, U.S.
- Spouse: Hannah Georgia Bryan
- Children: 4 (including John Screven)
- Relatives: Joseph Bryan (father-in-law)

James Proctor Screven (October 15, 1799 – July 10, 1859) was a surgeon, planter and mayor of Savannah, Georgia, United States. The city of Screven, Georgia, is named for him.

== Early life ==
Screven was born in 1799 to John Screven (1777–1830), a major, and Hannah Proctor. When Hannah died, his father married her sister, Sarah, who―with another sister, Martha―ran the Screven household in Savannah, Georgia.

Screven attended Jefferson Medical College, graduating in 1820. After studying in Europe for a few months, he returned to Savannah by 1823.

== Career ==
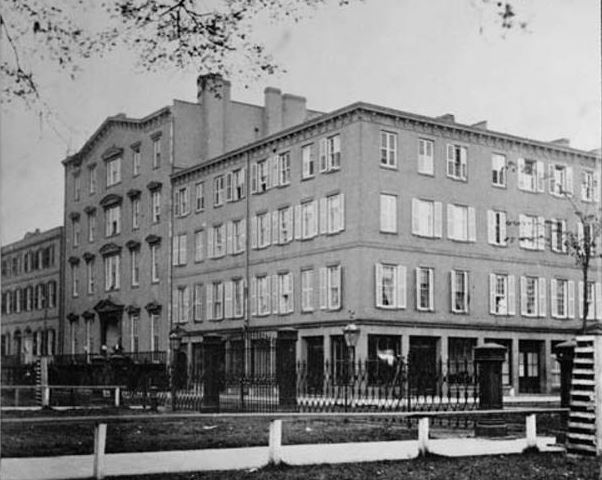
The now-demolished Screven House Hotel in Savannah, Georgia

Screven began a medical practice in Savannah with Dr. William Coffee Daniell in 1828. (Daniell married two of James's sisters: Martha from 1822 until her death in 1834, then Elizabeth.) In 1830, Screven left the practice and moved his wife and two children to the Bryan estate, Nonchalance, on Wilmington Island. There, they had two more children.

Screven was named as the president of the Atlantic and Gulf Railroad in December 1856. He was also the president of the Savannah, Albany, and Gulf Railroad, superintendent of Savannah Water Works and commander of the Savannah Volunteer Guards.

In 1856, Screven served one term as mayor of Savannah.

Screven was an investor in the Screven House Hotel in Savannah's Johnson Square, a location now occupied by the Manger Building.

== Personal life ==
In 1826, Screven married Hannah Georgia Bryan (1807–1887), daughter of Joseph Bryan and Delia Forman. This reunited the Screven and Bryan families after the death of Joseph's father, Josiah, following which Elizabeth Bryan remarried, to John Screven (1750–1801), James's grandfather. (Josiah Bryan was the son of patriot Jonathan Bryan.) Screven and Bryan had four known children: John, Sarah, Thomas and George.

In the 1840s, the Screvens purchased the plantations of Ceylon and Brewton Hill. By 1859, they also owned Ferry and Proctor plantations in South Carolina, plus land on Tybee Island, Georgia.

== Death ==
Screven died in 1859, aged 59. He was interred in Savannah's Laurel Grove Cemetery. His widow survived him by 28 years and was buried beside him upon her death in 1887. Their son, George, preceded her in death, aged 37.

=== Legacy ===
The city of Screven, Georgia, is named for him.
