= Thomas Gibbons (politician) =

American planter, politician, lawyer and steamboat owner (1757-1826)

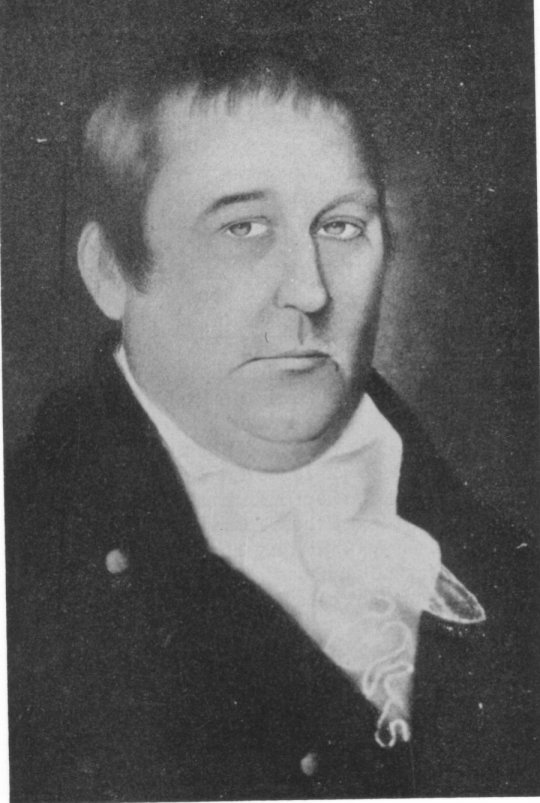

2nd Mayor of Savannah, Georgia
- In office 1799–1801
- Preceded by: Matthew McAllister
- Succeeded by: David Brydie Mitchell
- In office 1794–1795
- Preceded by: William Stephens
- Succeeded by: William Stephens
- In office 1791–1792
- Preceded by: John Houstoun
- Succeeded by: Joseph Habersham

Personal details
- Born: December 15, 1757 Mulberry Hill, Savannah, Province of Georgia, British America
- Died: May 16, 1826 (aged 68) New York City, New York, U.S.
- Party: Democratic-Republican
- Spouse: Ann Miles Heyward (m. 1780; died 1820)
- Children: 3
- Parent(s): Joseph Gibbons; Hannah Martin Gibbons

Thomas Gibbons (December 15, 1757 – May 16, 1826) was a planter, politician, lawyer, steamboat owner and the plaintiff in Gibbons vs. Ogden.

== Early life ==
Gibbons was born at Mulberry Hill, his family's plantation outside of Savannah, Georgia, on December 15, 1757. He was the son of Joseph Gibbons and Hannah (née Martin) Gibbons. Between 1752 and 1762, his father acquired several thousand acres between the Ogeechee and Savannah Rivers where he operated a saw mill, grew rice, and owned over 100 slaves.

He was educated at home and in Charleston, South Carolina, where he read law. During the American Revolutionary War, Gibbons, who was just eighteen when it started, was a passive Loyalist.

== Career ==
Following the Americans' victory over the British, Gibbons and other remaining Tories were convicted of treason and he was considered a prisoner of the Sheriff of Chatham County. His estate was confiscated and only after an executive order was he permitted to remain at his mother's house. Though, he was only allowed to go between there and Savannah. In January 1783, Gibbons petitioned the Assembly for citizenship, which was granted six months later under the stipulation that he could not vote, hold office for 14 years, or practice law. However, in only four years, he was granted full rights and privileges of citizenship.

Between 1791 and 1801, only four years after being granted full rights of citizenship, Gibbons served several terms as the Mayor of Savannah, Georgia, from 1791 to 1792, again in 1794 to 1795 and lastly from 1799 to 1801, as a Democratic-Republican. In addition to his service as mayor, he was also an alderman of the city. In 1801, he was appointed a federal judge.

As mayor, Gibbons was the head of the Savannah delegation who welcomed U.S. President George Washington to Savannah during Washington's "ceremonial tour of the South" in May 1791.

=== Move to New Jersey and letter to Senator Johnathan Dayton ===
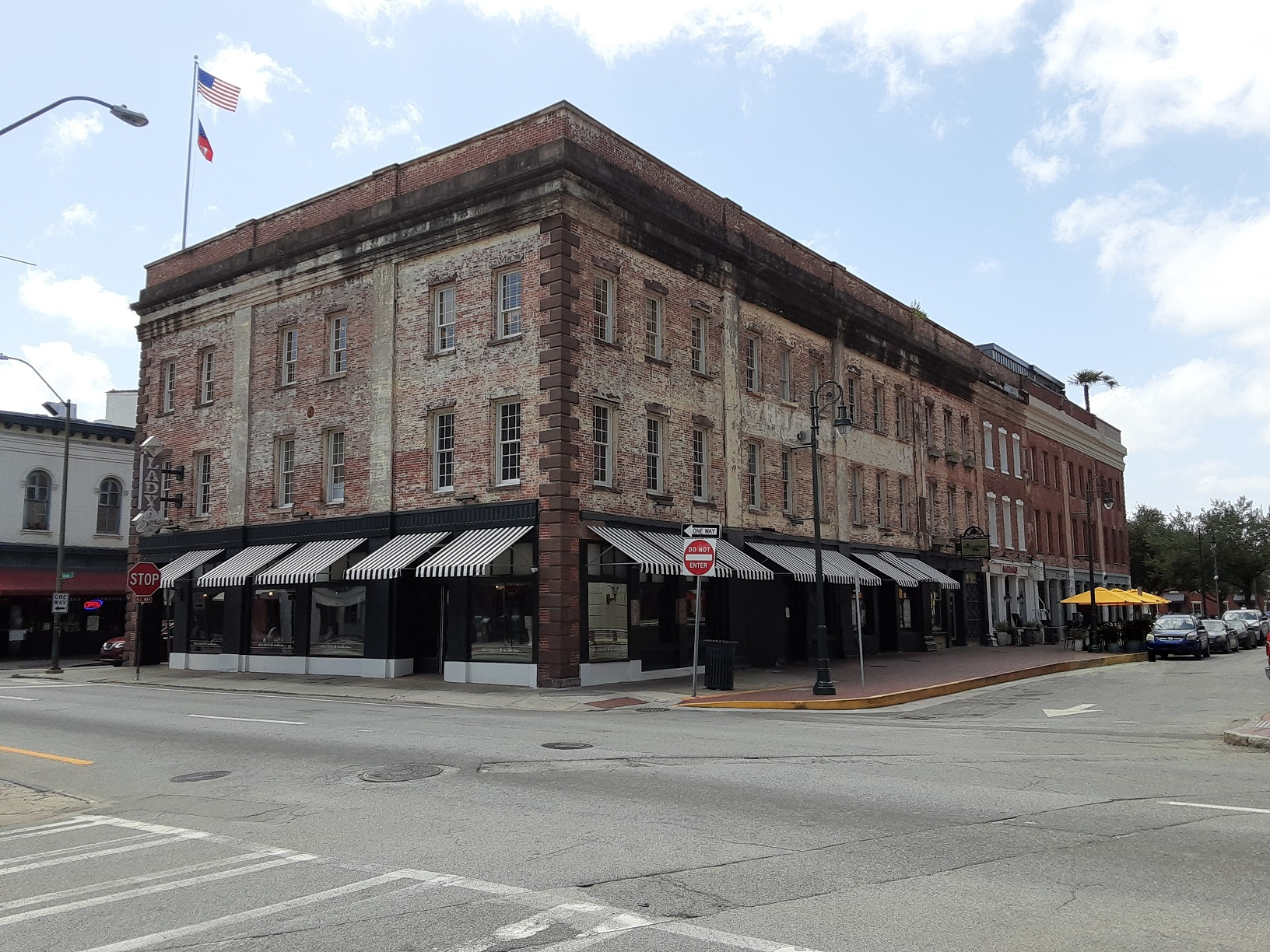
The Thomas Gibbons Range in Savannah

In 1801, Gibbons moved north and purchased a summer house in Elizabethtown in New Jersey, where he purchased a large private dock facility a few years later. His neighbor was former United States Senator and New Jersey Governor Aaron Ogden.

In December 1802 Gibbons wrote a letter to Johnathan Dayton, who then served as U.S. Senator from New Jersey, which in part asserted that the sexual liaison between Thomas Jefferson and Sally Hemings was a reality. The letter revealed the names of all of Hemings’ three children, who were alive at the time, and some other information, that newspaper accounts of the day did not reveal. The Gibbons letter had no known impact during Jefferson’s Presidency and was not known to participants in the controversy until the 1990s. Jefferson historians dropped their denial of the sexual liaison very soon after historian Joseph Ellis and others dumped a DNA report into national print and broadcast media without the foreknowledge of the DNA testing organizer, Dr. Eugene Foster.

=== Gibbons enters the steamboat business ===
Gibbons formed a partnership with Ogden, to operate steamboats. In 1817 Gibbons acquired a steam ferry, the Stoudinger, built by Allaire Iron Works, as a Hudson River ferry business between Elizabethtown and New Brunswick, New Jersey. In 1818, he acquired Bellona. Gibbons hired Cornelius Vanderbilt to captain the Bellona. Over the next few years, he also purchased Thistle, Swan, and Emerald. Vanderbilt biographer T. J. Stiles described Gibbons as "a staggeringly rich rice planter from Georgia." Gibbons turned out to be a mentor to Vanderbilt throughout his life.

In 1818, Gibbons broke his partnership with neighbor Aaron Ogden and started competing with him, just months before Gibbons hired Vanderbilt. Ogden had acquired rights to a steamboat monopoly in New York waters. The monopoly had been granted by the New York State Legislature to the politically influential patrician Robert Livingston and Robert Fulton, who had designed the steamboat. Both Livingston and Fulton had died by the time Vanderbilt started working for Gibbons. The monopoly was held by Livingston's heirs. They had granted a license to Ogden to run a ferry between New York and New Jersey. Gibbons launched his steamboat venture because of a personal dispute with Ogden, whom he hoped to drive into bankruptcy. To accomplish this, he undercut Ogden's prices. Ogden then secured an injunction against Gibbons on October 21, 1818. This prompted Gibbons to bring a legal action to overturn the monopoly. The landmark legal case, known as Gibbons vs. Ogden, was fought all the way to the United States Supreme Court, where Gibbons, represented by Daniel Webster and U.S. Attorney General William Wirt, eventually won in 1824.

In 1820, six years before his death, Gibbons had built, by William, what is today known as the Thomas Gibbons Range, in Savannah's Ellis Square. He had owned the lot since 1809.

== Personal life ==
In 1780, Gibbons was married to Ann Miles Heyward (1757–1820). Together, they were the parents of many children, only three of which survived to adulthood:

- Ann Heyward Gibbons (1790–1817), who married John Trumbull (1784–1859), son of Gov. Joseph Trumbull.
- William Gibbons (1794–1852), who built the Gibbons Mansion in Madison, New Jersey, and married Abigail Louisa Taintor (1791–1844).
- Thomas Heyward Gibbons (1795–1825), who married Mary Dayton, daughter of U.S. Senator and Speaker of the House Jonathan Dayton.

Gibbons died on May 16, 1826, in New York. He was "obese and diabetic from a life of rapacious eating and drinking."

=== Descendants ===
Through his daughter Ann, he was the grandfather of Thomas Gibbons Trumbull, John Heyward Trumbull, and Hannah Gibbons Trumbull (1813–1876), who married Ralph Henry Isham, and Sarah Backus Trumbull (1815–1903), who married Daniel Coit Ripley (1812–1893). However, due to Gibbon's falling out with his son-in-law, no child of John Trumbull was able to inherit any piece of Gibbon's estate or property as dictated in Gibbons' scathing will.

Through his son William, he was the grandfather of Sarah Taintor Gibbons (1829–1909), who was married to Ward McAllister (1827–1895); and William Heyward Gibbons (1831–1887), William's only son. William Heyward sold the family mansion, known as the Gibbons Mansion, to Daniel Drew in 1867 for $140,000. Drew donated the mansion and grounds to found Drew Theological Seminary (now known as Drew University), named in his honor.
