= William H. Stiles =

American politician (1808–1865)

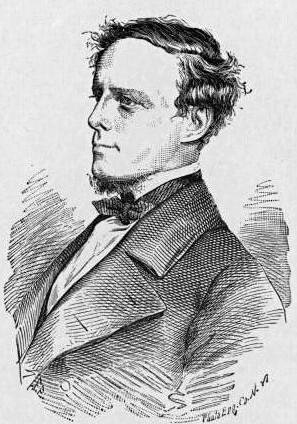
William Henry Stiles

William Henry Stiles (January 1, 1808 – December 20, 1865) was an American lawyer and politician who served one term as a United States representative from Georgia from 1843 to 1845.

== Biography ==
Born in Savannah, Georgia, in 1808, Stiles attended high school at the Hopkins School in New Haven, Connecticut. He was descended from the English colonel Thomas Stiles who fought in the English Civil War. He was also the grandson of politician Joseph Clay.

After graduating from Hopkins, Stiles studied law at Yale College, gained admittance to the state bar in 1831 and practiced law in Savannah.

=== Career ===
He served as the solicitor general for Georgia's eastern district from 1833 to 1836, and United States Attorney for the District of Georgia from 1836 to 1838. In 1842, Stiles was elected as a Democratic Representative from Georgia to the 28th United States Congress and served one term from March 4, 1843, until March 3, 1845.

=== After Congress ===
On April 19, 1845, Stiles was appointed by U.S. President James Polk as chargé d'affaires to the Austrian Empire, a position which he held until October 1849. He wrote a history of the revolutionary events that unfolded during his time in Austria.

He then returned to his beloved Etowah Cliffs in Cass County, where he had a plantation, and lived with his wife, Eliza Anne MacKay Stiles, and his children: Mary Cowper Stiles, William Henry Stiles Jr., and Robert MacKay Stiles. He was elected to the Georgia House of Representatives in 1858 and served as that body's speaker of the house.

Stiles served as one of Georgia's at-large delegates to the commercial congress in Montgomery, Alabama, in 1858. Also in 1858 he delivered an address, Southern Education for Southern Youth, to the Cherokee Baptist College. He also was a delegate to the 1860 Democratic National Convention. During the American Civil War, Stiles served as a colonel in the Confederate States Army.

=== Death and burial ===
He died in Savannah on December 20, 1865, and was buried in Laurel Grove Cemetery in that city.

U.S. House of Representatives
Preceded by Thomas Flournoy Foster	Member of the U.S. House of Representatives from Georgia's at-large congressional district March 4, 1843 – March 3, 1845	Succeeded by Seaborn Jones
Diplomatic posts
Preceded by Daniel Jenifer	U.S. Chargé to the Austrian Empire; 1845–1849	Succeeded by James Watson Webb
