= Beaulieu, Georgia =

- Unincorporated community
- Location within the state of Georgia Beaulieu (the United States)
- Coordinates: 31°55′58″N 81°6′46″W
- Country: United States
- State: Georgia
- County: Chatham
- Elevation: 10 ft (3.0 m)
- Time zone: UTC-5 (Eastern (EST))
  - Summer (DST): UTC-4 (EDT)
- ZIP codes: 31406
- Area code: 912
- GNIS feature ID: 331117

Beaulieu (locally /ˈbjuːli/ BEW-lee) is an unincorporated community located in Chatham County, Georgia. It lies about 12 miles south of downtown Savannah, Georgia, USA. The original Beaulieu tract consisted of about 500 acres and was deeded by the Trustees of the Colony of Georgia on April 27, 1737 to William Stephens, who was Secretary of the Colony and who upon General Oglethorpe's departure became Chief Executive of Georgia with the title of President He was partly put in possession of this land on the 19th of April, 1739. The tract was described as "bounded North by the Orphan House lands (Bethesda), North West by Montgomery, East by creeks and marshes, South by Vernon River."

Here in 1779 under Count d'Estaing the French landed to join the Americans under General Lincoln in the Siege Of Savannah.

In the nineteenth century it was known as a summer resort for well-heeled Savannahians. A few old homes remain, but most current structures are more modern. The village still retains a Deep South atmosphere, with big live oaks covered with Spanish moss.

The primary access road to Beaulieu is Beaulieu Avenue, which runs for approximately 1.1 miles from Whitfield Avenue to Shipyard Road. Today Beaulieu is almost entirely a residential community. The majority of its lots are situated along the Vernon River, a saltwater tidal creek that eventually peters out as it reaches the southside neighborhoods of Savannah.
