= John Glen (1744–1799) =

American politician

Chief Justice of Georgia
- In office 1776–1778

6th Mayor of Savannah, Georgia
- In office 1797–1798
- Preceded by: John Noel
- Succeeded by: Matthew McAllister

Personal details
- Born: July 26, 1744 Charleston, South Carolina
- Died: May 1799 (aged 54)
- Parents: William Glen (father); Ann Alricks Glen (mother)

John Glen (July 26, 1744 – May 1799) was an American politician who served as the first Chief Justice of Georgia (1776–1778) and Mayor of Savannah (1797–1798).

== Biography ==
Glen was born on May 4, 1758, in Charleston, South Carolina, the son of Ann (née Alricks) and William Glen. In 1767, after graduating in law, he moved to Savannah, Georgia, where he started his own legal practice. In 1769, he was elected to the lower Assembly in the Georgia colonial legislature. In 1776, he was elected as Georgia's first Chief Justice; he served until 1778. He was captured during the Revolutionary War and was detained as a prisoner of war in Charleston. He returned to Savannah in 1785. He served as mayor of Savannah from 1797 to 1798. He died in May 1799.
