= Matthew Hall McAllister =

American politician (1800–1865)

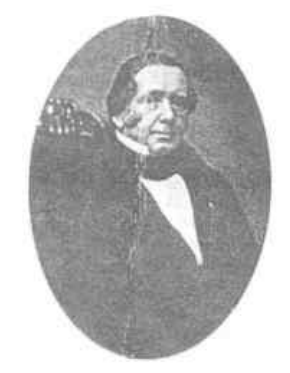
- McAllister in c.1860

Judge of the United States Circuit Court for the Districts of California
- In office March 3, 1855 – January 12, 1863
- Appointed by: Franklin Pierce
- Preceded by: Seat established by 10 Stat. 631
- Succeeded by: Seat abolished

Member of the Georgia Senate from Chatham County
- In office 1834–1837
- Preceded by: William C. Daniel
- Succeeded by: William Washington Gordon

Personal details
- Born: Matthew Hall McAllister; October 26, 1800 Savannah, Georgia
- Died: December 19, 1865 (aged 65) San Francisco, California
- Party: Democratic
- Education: Princeton University read law

Matthew Hall McAllister (October 26, 1800 – December 19, 1865) was a United States circuit judge of the United States Circuit Court for the Districts of California.

== Education and career ==
Born on October 26, 1800, in Savannah, Georgia, the son of Matthew McAllister. McAllister attended Princeton University and read law in 1820. He entered private practice in Savannah from 1820 to 1849. He was the United States Attorney for the District of Georgia from 1827 to 1834. He was a member of the Georgia State Senate from 1834 to 1837. He was Mayor of Savannah from 1837 to 1839. He was an alderman for Savannah from 1839 to 1841. He was the Democratic candidate for Governor of Georgia in 1845. He returned to private practice in San Francisco, California from 1850 to 1853. He was a Democratic candidate for United States Senator from Georgia in 1853.

== Federal judicial service ==
McAllister was nominated by President Franklin Pierce on March 2, 1855, to the United States Circuit Court for the Districts of California, to a new seat authorized by 10 Stat. 631. He was confirmed by the United States Senate on March 3, 1855, and received his commission the same day. His service terminated on January 12, 1863, due to his resignation. The United States Circuit Court for the Districts of California was abolished on March 3, 1863, by 12 Stat. 794, thus McAllister was the only Judge to ever serve on the court.

== Death ==
McAllister died on December 19, 1865, in San Francisco. The city's McAllister Street was named in his honor, and a bronze statue of McAllister stands in the 400 block of the street on the north side of San Francisco City Hall.

== Sources ==
Party political offices
Preceded by Mark Anthony Cooper	Democratic nominee for Governor of Georgia; 1845	Succeeded by George W. Towns
Legal offices
Preceded by Seat established by 10 Stat. 631	Judge of the United States Circuit Court for the Districts of California; 1855–1863	Succeeded by Seat abolished
