= Thomas U. P. Charlton =

American writer and public servant

- Born: Thomas Usher Pulaski Charlton; November 1779; Camden, South Carolina, U.S.
- Died: December 21, 1835 (aged 56); Savannah, Georgia, U.S.
- Resting place: Laurel Grove Cemetery, Savannah, Georgia, U.S.
- Occupation: writer
- Spouse(s): Emily Walter (1803–1808; her death); Ellen Glasco (–1820; her death); Clementine Helena LeFebrve (1828–1835; his death)
- Children: Robert M. Charlton; Thomas Jackson Charlton

Thomas Usher Pulaski Charlton (November 1779 – December 21, 1835) was an American writer and public servant in Savannah, Georgia, United States. He was the city's mayor for two terms. He was the second in a line of six Thomas Charltons, five of whom were physicians.

Savannah's Charlton Street is named in his honor.

== Life and career ==
Charlton was born in November 1779 in Camden, South Carolina, to Thomas Charlton Sr. and Lucy Kenan.

He was admitted to the Georgia bar in 1800, and by the age of 21, he was a member of the Georgia State Legislature.

Charlton became judge of the Eastern Circuit in 1808.

In 1809, Charlton's book, The Life of Major General James Jackson, was published. He was a close friend of both Jackson and governor John Milledge.

He was mayor of Savannah, Georgia, between 1815 and 1817, then 1819 to 1821.

Charlton was married three times. His first two wives, Emily Walter (married 1803) and Ellen Glasco, each died young. His third wife, Clementine, whom he married when she was 22, survived him by forty years. Emily's father, who died when Charlton was around ten, was botanist Thomas Walter.

Charlton's son, Robert M. Charlton, became a senator. His other son, Thomas Jackson Charlton, preceded him in death by two months, aged 29.

=== Death ===
Charlton died on December 21, 1835, aged 56. He was initially interred in Savannah's Colonial Park Cemetery, but his remains were moved in 1853, when the cemetery closed, to Laurel Grove Cemetery.

Charlton Street in Savannah is named in his honor.

== See also ==
- List of mayors of Savannah, Georgia
