= Charles Harris (mayor) =

British-born lawyer and politician

- Born: 1772; England
- Died: March 17, 1827 (aged 54–55); Savannah, Georgia, U.S.
- Resting place: Colonial Park Cemetery, Savannah, Georgia, U.S.
- Spouse: Catherine McCauley McIntosh (1798–1815; her death)

Charles Harris (1772 – March 17, 1827) was a British-born lawyer who emigrated to the United States. He served two-and-a-half terms as mayor of Savannah, Georgia. He was also a slave owner. Savannah's Harris Street is named for him, as is Harris County, Georgia.

== Life and career ==
Harris was born in England in 1772 to William Harris, a barrister and first cousin to Lord Malmesbury, and Elizabeth Dymock.

After being educated in France, he emigrated to the United States at the age of sixteen, settling in Savannah, Georgia, where he studied law under Samuel Stirk. He opened is own practice in 1793.

In 1798, he married Catherine McCauley McIntosh, youngest daughter of American Revolutionary War hero Lachlan McIntosh. They had three known children: Sarah Elizabeth (1809), Catherine Virginia (1811) and McIntosh (1814). Sarah died at the age of 20 or 21, Catherine died aged four, and McIntosh after eighteen days.

After serving as an alderman in 1801, Harris served as mayor of Savannah from 1802 to 1804 and from 1807 to 1808, two-and-a-half terms in total. He was also twice elected to the Judgeship of the Eastern Circuit, but declined on both occasions.

Catherine died in 1815, aged 35 or 36, which partly precipitated Harris' semi-retirement from public affairs.

After the Savannah fire of January 1820, which destroyed all properties between Bay Street and Broughton Street and between Jefferson Street and Abercorn Street, he offered his property as a shelter for those made homeless.

== Death and legacy ==
Harris died on March 17, 1827, aged 54 or 55. He is interred in the Lachlan McIntosh family vault in Savannah's Colonial Park Cemetery.

At the time of his death, Harris owned seven slaves and kept another seventeen at his plantation on Skidaway Island.

Savannah's Harris Street was named for him, as is Harris County, Georgia.
