= George W. Owens =

American politician (1786–1856)

George Welshman Owens (August 29, 1786 – March 2, 1856) was a United States representative and lawyer from Georgia.

== Early life ==
Born in Savannah, Georgia, in 1786, Owens attended school in Harrow, England, and graduated from the University of Cambridge. After studying law in the office of Mr. Chitty in London, Owens returned to Savannah, gained admittance to the state bar and practiced law.

== Political career ==
Owens was elected as a Jacksonian Representative from Georgia to the 24th United States Congress and won reelection as a Democrat to the 25th Congress, serving from March 4, 1835, until March 3, 1839. After his congressional service, Owens returned to practicing law and died in Savannah on March 2, 1856. He was buried in Laurel Grove Cemetery in that same city.

Political offices
Preceded by William Waring	Mayor of Savannah; 1832–1833	Succeeded by William Thorne Williams
U.S. House of Representatives
Preceded by Roger Lawson Gamble	Member of the U.S. House of Representatives from Georgia's at-large congressional district March 4, 1835 – March 3, 1839	Succeeded by Hopkins Holsey
