= List of mayors of Savannah, Georgia =

Mayor of Savannah
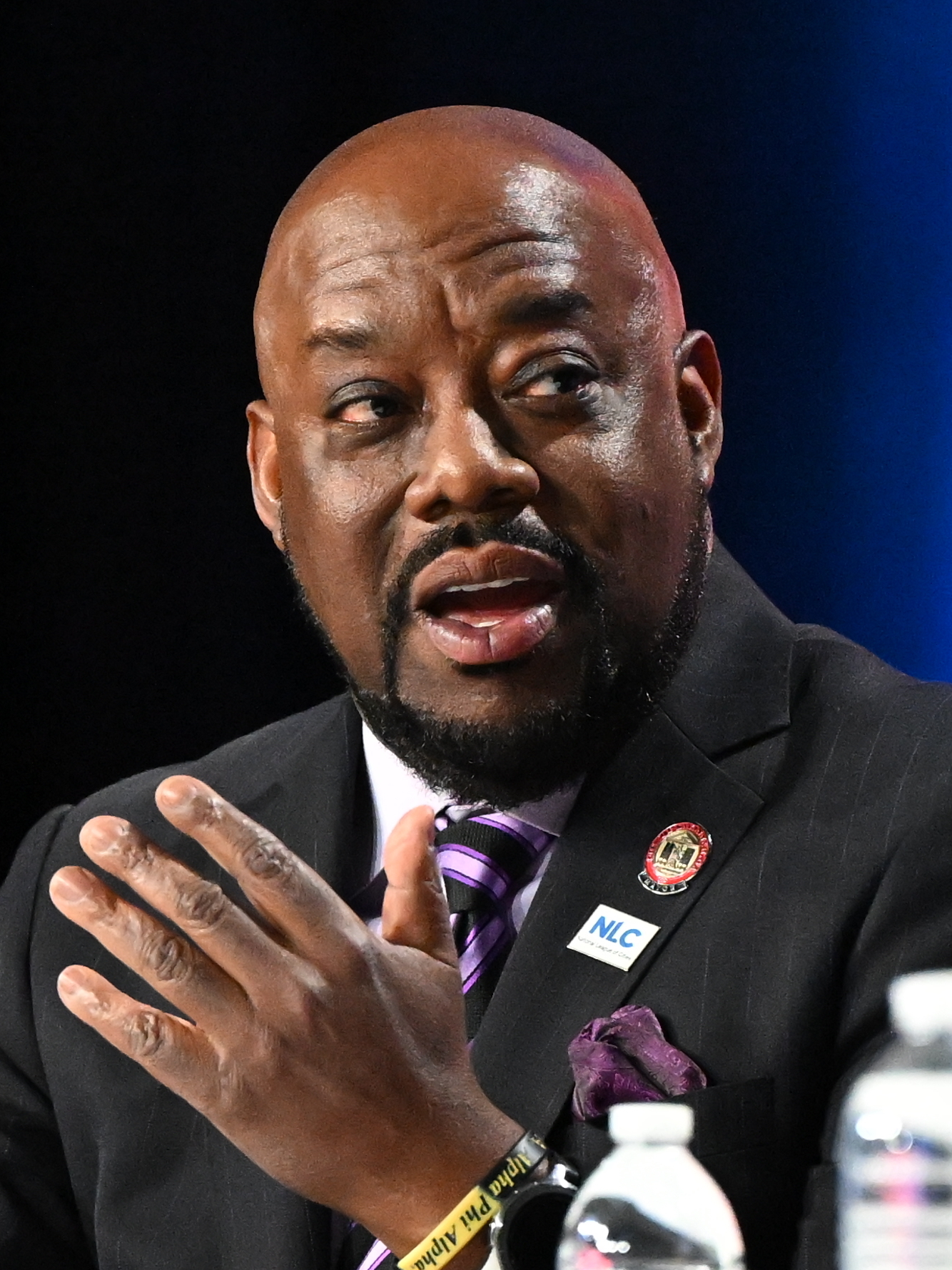
- Incumbent; Van R. Johnson since January 1, 2020
- Style: The Honorable
- Term length: 4 years, no term limits
- Inaugural holder: John Houstoun
- Formation: 1790
- Salary: $78,898
- Website: www.savannahga.gov

The mayor is the highest elected official in Savannah, Georgia. Since its incorporation by charter on 23 December 1789, and the first mayor, John Houstoun, was elected by aldermen on 8 March 1790, following citizen election of aldermen on 1 March 1790, the city has had 67 mayors.

On 31 May 1958, the term for mayor was extended from two years to four years by popular vote and with approval of the state government.

Election for mayor is held every four years, and is held as a non-partisan election, As of 7 November 2023, Van Johnson was re-elected for a four-year term.

== List ==
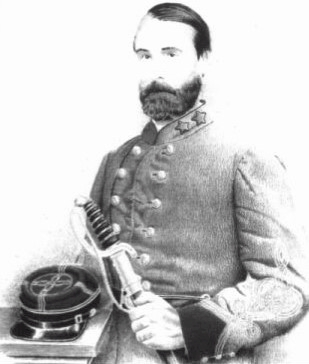
Mayor Edward Clifford Anderson (1865–1869, 1873–1877) was the first mayor after the Civil War.

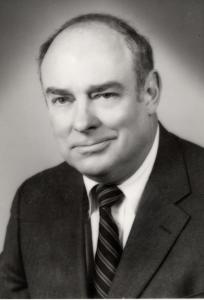
Mayor Julius Curtis Lewis Jr. (1966–1970) was the first Republican mayor and the first non-Democratic mayor since the Civil War.

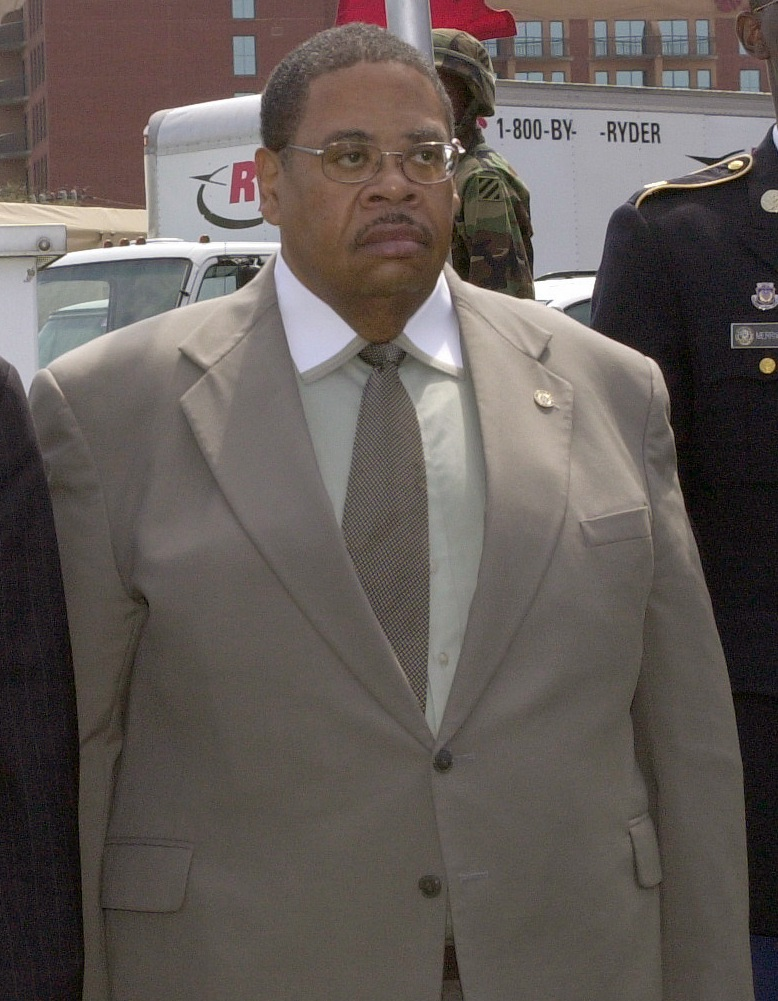
Mayor Floyd Adams Jr. (1996–2003) was the first African-American mayor of Savannah.

#	Portrait	Mayor	Term start	Term end	Terms	Party	Notes
1		John Houstoun	1790	1791	1	None	
2		Thomas Gibbons	1791	1792	1	None	
3		Joseph Habersham	1792	1793	1	None	
4		William Stephens	1793	1794	1	None	
(2)		Thomas Gibbons	1794	1795	1	None	
(4)		William Stephens	1795	1796	1	None	
5		John Noel	1796	1797	1	None	
6		John Glen	1797	1798	1	None	
7		Matthew McAllister	1798	1799	1	Democratic-Republican	
(2)		Thomas Gibbons	1799	1801	2	Democratic-Republican	
8		David B. Mitchell	1801	1802	1	Democratic-Republican	
9		Charles Harris	1802	1804	2	Democratic-Republican	
(5)		John Noel	1804	1807	3	Democratic-Republican	
10		William Davies	1807	1807	1/2	Democratic-Republican	
(9)		Charles Harris	1807	1808	1/2	Democratic-Republican	
11		John Williamson	1808	1809	1	Democratic-Republican	
12		William Bulloch	1809	1811	2	Democratic-Republican	
13		Thomas Mendenhall Jr.	1811	1811	1/2	Democratic-Republican	
(12)		William Bulloch	1811	1812	1/2	Democratic-Republican	
14		George Jones	1812	1814	2	Democratic-Republican	
(7)		Matthew McAllister	1814	1815	Partial	Democratic-Republican	
15		Thomas Charlton	1815	1817	2 1/2	Democratic-Republican	
16		James Wayne	1817	1819	2	Democratic-Republican	
(15)		Thomas Charlton	1819	1821	1 1/2	Democratic-Republican	
17		James Morrison	1821	1824	3 1/2	Democratic-Republican	
18		William Daniell	1824	1826	2	Jacksonian	
19		Joseph W. Jackson	1826	1828	2	Jacksonian	
20		William T. Williams	1828	1830	2	Democratic	
21		William Waring	1830	1832	2	Democratic	
22		George W. Owens	1832	1833	Partial	Democratic	
(20)		William T. Williams	1833	1834	1 1/2	Democratic	
23		William Gordon	1834	1836	1 1/2	Democratic	
24		William Cuyler	1836	1836	1/2	Democratic	
25		John Nicoll	1836	1837	1	Democratic	
26		Matthew H. McAllister	1837	1839	1 1/2	Democratic	
27		Robert M. Charlton	1839	1841	2 1/2	Democratic	
(20)		William T. Williams	1841	1842	1	Democratic	
28		Richard Arnold	1842	1843	1	Whig	
(20)		William T. Williams	1843	1844	1	Democratic	
29		Richard Wayne	1844	1845	1	Democratic	
30		Henry Burroughs	1845	1848	3	Whig	
(29)		Richard Wayne	1848	1851	3	Democratic	
(28)		Richard Arnold	1851	1852	1	Whig	
(29)		Richard Wayne	1852	1853	1	Democratic	
31		John Elliott Ward	1853	1854	1	Democratic	
32		Edward C. Anderson	1854	1856	2	American	
33		James Proctor Screven	1856	1857	1	Democratic	
(29)		Richard Wayne ^{†}	1857	1858	Partial	Democratic	
34		Thomas Turner	1858	1859	1 1/2	Democratic	
(28)		Richard Arnold	1859	1860	1	American	
35		Charles C. Jones	1860	1861	1	Democratic (Southern)	
36		Thomas Purse	1861	1862	1	Democratic (Southern)	
37		Thomas Holcombe	1862	1863	1	Democratic (Southern)	
(28)		Richard Arnold	1863	1865	1	Democratic (Southern)	
(32)		Edward C. Anderson	1865	1869	4	Democratic	
38		John Screven	1869	1873	4	Democratic	
(32)		Edward C. Anderson	1873	1877	2	Democratic	
39		John Wheaton	1877	1883	3	Democratic	
40		Rufus E. Lester	1883	1889	3	Democratic	
41		John Schwarz	1889	1891	1	Democratic	
42		John McDonough	1891	1895	2	Democratic	
43		Herman Myers	1895	1897	1	Democratic	
44		Peter Meldrim	1897	1899	1	Democratic	
(43)		Herman Myers	1899	1907	4	Democratic	
45		George Tiedeman	1907	1913	3	Democratic	
46		Richard Davant ^{†}	1913	1915	1 1/2	Democratic	
47		Wallace Pierpont	1915	1919	1 1/2	Democratic	
48		Murray Stewart	1919	1923	2	Democratic	
49		Paul Seabrook	1923	1925	1	Democratic	
50		Robert Hull ^{†}	1925	1927	1 1/2	Democratic	
51		Thomas Hoynes	1927	1929	1/2	Democratic	
52		Gordon Saussy	1929	1931	1 1/2	Democratic	
(51)		Thomas Hoynes	1931	1933	1/2	Democratic	
53		Thomas Gamble	1933	1937	2	Democratic	
54		Robert M. Hitch	1937	1939	1	Democratic	
(53)		Thomas Gamble ^{†}	1939	1945	3 1/2	Democratic	
55		Peter Roe Nugent	1945	1947	1 1/2	Democratic	
56		John G. Kennedy	1947	1949	1	Democratic	
57		Olin Fulmer	1949	1955	3	Democratic	
58		Lee Mingledorff, Jr.	1955	1960	3	Democratic	First elected to a two-year term where he served from January 24, 1955 until January 21, 1957. Re-elected to a second two-year term beginning January 21, 1957. In 1958, the city shifted to a four-year mayoral term and a special election was held. Mingledorff won re-election to a 4-year term running from October 6, 1958 to October 1, 1962. He resigned prematurely on August 1, 1960 with the remainder of his term completed by vice-mayor Maclean.
59		Malcolm R. Maclean	1960	1966	2	Democratic	
60		J.C. Lewis, Jr.	1966	1970	1	Republican	
61		John Rousakis	1970	1992	5	Democratic	First Greek-American mayor
62		Susan Weiner	1992	1996	1	Republican	First female mayor
63		Floyd Adams, Jr.	1996	2004	2	Democratic	First African-American mayor
64		Otis Johnson	2004	2012	2	Democratic	
65		Edna Jackson	2012	2016	1	Democratic	First African-American female mayor
66		Eddie DeLoach	2016	2020	1	Republican	
67		Van R. Johnson	2020	Incumbent	1	Democratic	

Notes

^{†} Deceased/murdered in office.

== See also ==
- Savannah, Georgia
- Timeline of Savannah, Georgia
- Garden City, Georgia
- List of mayors of Garden City, Georgia
- List of mayors of Atlanta
- List of mayors of Augusta, Georgia
- List of mayors of Columbus, Georgia
- List of mayors of Macon, Georgia
