= Laurel Grove Cemetery =

Historic cemetery in Chatham County, Georgia, US

- U.S. National Register of Historic Places
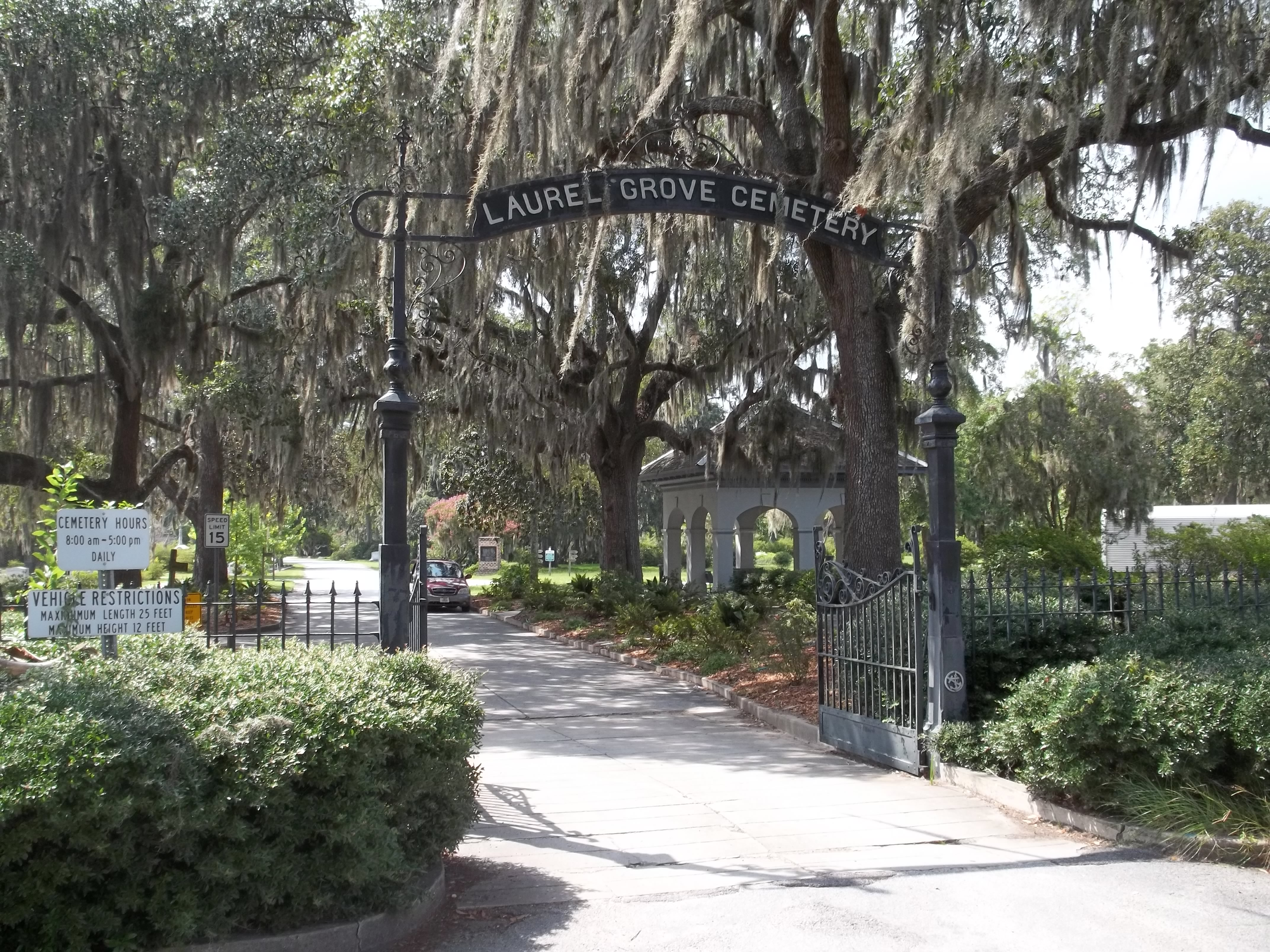

- Location within the United States Location within Georgia
- Interactive map of Laurel Grove Cemetery
- Location: Savannah, Georgia, United States
- Coordinates: 32.06548°N 81.10833°W
- Built: 1853
- Architect: James O. Morse; William George; Sholl & Fay
- NRHP reference No.: 78000972 (original); 83000187 (increase)

Significant dates
- Added to NRHP: September 6, 1978
- Boundary increase: August 4, 1983

Laurel Grove Cemetery is a cemetery located in midtown Savannah, Georgia. It includes the original cemetery for white people (now known as Laurel Grove North) and a companion burial ground (called Laurel Grove South) that was reserved for slaves and free people of color. The original cemetery contains the graves of many of Savannah's Confederate veterans of the American Civil War. The cemetery was dedicated in 1852. The lawyer and poet Henry Rootes Jackson delivered the dedication address.

The south section of the cemetery was added to the National Register of Historic Places (NRHP) in 1978 and the north section was added to the NRHP in 1983.

== History ==
Although planned as early as 1818, Laurel Grove first opened for burials in 1853. Administrators of Laurel Grove have recently begun to computerize the cemetery's burial records.

Notable interments
Name	Notability	References
Edward Clifford Anderson Sr.	Mayor of Savannah for eight terms before and after the American Civil War, 15-year veteran of the U.S. Navy, and brigadier general in the Confederate States Army. Led Savannah's Reconstruction efforts.
George Wayne Anderson Jr.	Commander of Fort McAllister during American Civil War, member of the Republican Blues. Born at, and later owned, the Lebanon plantation located between Fort McAllister and Savannah.
Francis S. Bartow	Confederate politician and Confederate States Army officer during the American Civil War
John M. Berrien	U.S. senator from the state of Georgia
William Bellinger Bulloch	U.S. senator from Georgia and relative of U.S. president Theodore Roosevelt
William Gaston Bulloch	Physician
Robert Milledge Charlton	U.S. senator representing Georgia
Isaiah Davenport	Master builder; constructed what is now known as the Isaiah Davenport House in 1820
Stephen Elliott	37th bishop of the Episcopal Church in the United States of America (ECUSA)
William Bennett Fleming	U.S. representative from Georgia
Jeremy F. Gilmer	Chief of engineers for the Confederate States Army during the American Civil War
William Washington Gordon	Politician and businessman, co-founded and served as first president of the Central Railroad and Banking Company (now the Central of Georgia Railroad)
Delia Green	Child murder victim and inspiration for the song "Delia's Gone", initially buried in an unmarked grave. In 2020 the Killer Blues Headstone Project placed a headstone for her at that location.
Simon Guckenheimer	Merchant
Alfred Haywood	Merchant and city councillor
W. W. Law	American civil rights leader and president of the Savannah NAACP, who established many African American cultural institutions in Savannah, Georgia.
Juliette Gordon Low	Founder of the Girl Scouts of the USA
George Paul Harrison, Sr.	Brigadier general (1861–1862) and colonel (1864–1865) in the Georgia (Confederate) militia; member of the Georgia House of Representatives
Julian Hartridge	U.S. representative from Georgia
Mary Haskell	Educator
Frank O'Driscoll Hunter	World War I fighter ace and the recipient of Distinguished Service Cross five times. Later served as commanding general of the VIII Fighter Command and, later the First Air Force, during World War II
Florence Martus	Nicknamed "the Waving Girl", the unofficial greeter of all ships entering and leaving the Port of Savannah from 1887 to 1931
Lucy Barrow McIntire	Activist, preservationist, actor, and poet
Lafayette McLaws	U.S. Army officer and a Confederate general in the American Civil War
Isaac P. Mendes	Rabbi
John Millen	U.S. representative and lawyer from Georgia
Thomas Manson Norwood	U.S. senator and U.S. representative from Georgia
George Welshman Owens	U.S. representative and lawyer from Georgia
James Lord Pierpont	Writer and composer of the song "Jingle Bells"
John William Pearson	Businessman and Confederate captain of the Oklawaha Rangers
Phoebe Pember	Confederate nurse at Chimborazo Hospital in Richmond, Virginia, during the American Civil War
Philip Phillips	Lawyer, politician and U.S. representative from Alabama
Anna Davenport Raines	Founding Vice President of the United Daughters of the Confederacy
James C. Saltus	Confederate States Army officer, carpenter; oversaw the construction of the third City Market building
Augustus Schwaab	Architect
Ephraim Scudder	Builder, prominent in the antebellum form around Savannah
Moxley Sorrel	Confederate States Army officer and historian of the Confederacy
William Henry Stiles	U.S. representative from Georgia.
James Johnston Waring	Physician
Joseph Wasden	Confederate officer in the American Civil War
James Moore Wayne	Associate justice of the Supreme Court of the United States and a U.S. representative from Georgia
Richard Wayne	Mayor of Savannah for four terms

== See also ==
- List of burial places of justices of the Supreme Court of the United States
