= List of 2022 Women's March locations =

A new ongoing stream of pro-abortion rights protests was launched in May 2022, in reaction to a leak of a SCOTUS draft majority opinion, authored by Justice Samuel Alito, that would overturn Roe v. Wade. The rallies and marches reached a peak on Saturday, May 14, under the name "Bans Off Our Bodies."

== United States ==
Listed below are over 450 events that took place in the U.S. on the weekend of May 14 (with a few happening before or after, as noted)

- AL
- AK
- AZ
- AR
- CA
- CO
- CT
- DE
- DC
- FL
- GA
- HI
- ID
- IL
- IN
- IA
- KS
- KY
- LA
- ME
- MD
- MA
- MI
- MN
- MS
- MO
- MT
- NE
- NV
- NH
- NJ
- NM
- NY
- NC
- ND
- OH
- OK
- OR
- PA
- RI
- SC
- SD
- TN
- TX
- UT
- VT
- VA
- WA
- WV
- WI
- WY

States	Cities	Photo	Approximate attendance	Notes
Washington, D.C.			20,000	Washington Monument, National Mall - Supreme Court; the demonstration was expected to draw up to 17,000 people. Among those who spoke on stage during the rally were US Rep. Barbara Lee (D-CA) and DC Council Member Janeese Lewis George. At the Supreme Court, the marchers were greeted by 50 counter-protesters.
Alabama	Birmingham		hundreds	People from all across the state of Alabama traveled to Linn Park on Saturday. After the rally, they marched around the park's perimeter.
Alabama	Mobile		hundreds	Government Plaza, 205 Government St
Alabama	Montgomery		13	Alabama State Capitol steps
Alaska	Anchorage		hundreds	intersection of Northern Lights Boulevard and New Seward
Alaska	Fairbanks		4	intersection of Geist Rd & University Ave
Alaska	Homer		3	WKFL Park
Alaska	Juneau		39	10th & Egan
Alaska	Ketchikan		few dozen	The Rock, 210 Front St
Alaska	Kodiak		100+	Sargent Park
Alaska	Wasilla			Newcomb Park Wasilla Lake, 891 E Parks Hwy
Arizona	Flagstaff		300	People gathered at Murdoch Community Center and marched down Butler Avenue to Whole Foods and back.
Arizona	Payson		25	sign event held at corner Hwy 87 @ Hwy 260, State Rte 87
Arizona	Phoenix		thousands	Arizona State Capitol. Speakers included Arizona Secretary of State Katie Hobbs (now running for governor) and state Sen. Raquel Terán.
Arizona	Sedona			Corner Democracy, Arizona 89A & Coffee Pot Drive / Jamesen Memorial Park
Arizona	Show Low			(event location private)
Arizona	Tucson		thousands	Armory Park. Tucson Mayor Regina Romero and other elected officials spoke to the crowd.
Arkansas	Eureka Springs			Basin Spring Park
Arkansas	Fayetteville		few dozen	Washington County Courthouse
Arkansas	Fort Smith		75	Sebastian County Courthouse - Garrison Ave
Arkansas	Jonesboro		50	Craighead County Courthouse (corner of Main Street and Washington)
Arkansas	Little Rock		hundreds	Arkansas State Capitol
Arkansas	Mountain Home			Baxter County Courthouse
Arkansas	Texarkana		25	US District Court (Texarkana), 500 N State Line Ave. The same site had a second rally on Sunday, with 20 people.
California	Bakersfield		100-150	Demonstrators gathered at Jastro Park on Truxtun Ave.
California	Benicia		few hundred	First Street Green, East B Street & 1st Street; current Benicia Mayor Steve Young, former Benicia Mayor Elizabeth Patterson and Solano County District Attorney candidate Sharon Henry spoke at the rally before the march.
California	Burbank		40+	North Mariposa Street & Chandler Boulevard - Chandler Bike Path toward Buena Vista
California	Carpinteria		60-100	intersection of Linden Ave. & Carpinteria Ave.
California	Carlsbad		500 - 700	Hundreds gathered near Carlsbad Village Train Station at State St and Grand Ave, then marched to Scenic Overlook Park near Carlsbad City Beach. Encinitas Mayor and 38th State Senate District candidate Catherine Blakespear was a keynote speaker.
California	Chico		300+	Chico City Plaza - march downtown
California	Claremont		100+	Foothill Boulevard & North Indian Hill Boulevard
California	Cloverdale			Cloverdale Plaza, Cloverdale Blvd. between 1st and 2nd Sts
California	El Centro		30+	Dozens gathered on the sidewalk in front of the Imperial Valley Planned Parenthood of the Pacific Southwest Health Center
California	Eureka		100	Eureka Courthouse, 825 5th St
California	Fort Bragg		30	in front of Fort Bragg Town Hall, N Main Street
California	Fresno		1,000	West Nees Avenue & North Blackstone Avenue, in front of River Park shopping center; US Rep Jim Costa participated.
California	Hollister		30+	sidewalk outside the San Benito County Superior Court at 450 Fourth St
California	Long Beach		1,000+	Hundreds marched from Harvey Milk Promenade Park to Long Beach City Hall.
California	Los Angeles		at least several thousand	Los Angeles City Hall; the rally, which had been planned for months, gained a new sense of urgency following the SCOTUS leak, and received more than 50,000 signups, according to the Women's March Federation. Celebrity women's rights attorney Gloria Allred shared her pre-Roe back alley abortion story with the crowd. Other speakers included LA Mayor Eric Garcetti, California First "Partner" Jennifer Siebel Newsom, US Sen Sen. Alex Padilla, US Reps. Karen Bass (current candidate for LA Mayor) and Maxine Waters, state Sen. Sydney Kamlager and Los Angeles City Council President Nury Martinez. Among celebrity speakers and participants were actors Kate Beckinsale and Lisa Ann Walter. Another event was planned at the United States Courthouse on West 1st St, by the group Rise Up 4 Abortion Rights.
California	Modesto		200+	outside the Planned Parenthood office on McHenry Avenue - intersection of Briggsmore & McHenry Aves
California	Monterey			Window on the Bay, Del Monte Ave / Pacific St sidewalk outside Colton Hall lawn (~50 people)
California	Mountain View		200-300	Mountain View Caltrain station - four corners of Castro and El Camino Real
California	Oakland		200+	Lake Merritt; state Sen. Nancy Skinner spoke at the rally.
California	Ojai			Libbey Outdoor Park Entrance, E. Ojai Ave
California	Palm Springs		500	Frances Stevens Park
California	Palo Alto			Town & Country Village, 855 El Camino Real
California	Palos Verdes Estates		200+	Malaga Cove Plaza
California	Pasadena			Pasadena City Hall
California	Petaluma		hundreds	Walnut Park - march up Petaluma Boulevard North / intersection of Petaluma Blvd & Washington St
California	Riverside			Riverside City Hall Stage, 3900 Main St - march downtown
California	Sacramento		thousands	At least 800 people gathered for a march that started at the west steps of the California State Capitol, then proceeded on a 2-mile loop along 9th St, T St, 5th St and the Capitol Mall. Back at the capitol, a rally was held; speakers included Sacramento Mayor Darrell Steinberg, Senate President Pro Tem Toni Atkins, State Treasurer Fiona Ma and state Attorney General Rob Bonta. A dozen counter-protesters also showed up outside the crowd. After the march, a Planned Parenthood statewide bus tour was launched.
California	San Diego		5,000+	Thousands marched a mile through the downtown area, ending with a rally outside the San Diego Hall of Justice along West Broadway and near the federal courthouse; a group of 50 anti-abortion activists held a counter protest.
California	San Jose			San Jose City Hall; Candidate for state assembly Gail Pellerin attended the rally.
California	San Francisco		10,000+	Thousands marched down Market Street from Civic Center to the Embarcadero. SF Mayor London Breed participated in the march. In San Francisco's Mission District, at least a couple hundred people gathered for a "Rise Up 4 Abortion Rights" rally outside the BART Station at Mission and 24th.
California	San Luis Obispo		300	SLO Superior Court, Monterey St - march downtown
California	Santa Ana		a few thousand	Centennial Regional Park (4,000-5,000 expected). Speakers included Lt. Gov. Eleni Kounalakis and US Rep. Katie Porter.
California	Santa Barbara		2,500	De La Guerra Plaza. State Senator Monique Limón spoke at the rally.
California	Santa Cruz		several hundred	Santa Cruz Clock Tower, N. Pacific Ave
California	Sebastopol		100	crossroads of Main Street and Bodega Avenue (CA-116 & CA-12)
California	Sherman Oaks			Sherman Oaks Galleria
California	Sonoma		20-25	Sonoma Plaza
California	Sonora		40+	Protesters gathered at Courthouse Square, then marched down Washington Street and back up.
California	Stockton			
California	Temecula			Temecula Duck Pond (intersection of Ynez and Rancho California Roads) - Temecula City Hall
California	Ukiah		100	Mendocino County Courthouse
California	Venice			Venice Beach Pride Lifeguard Tower
California	Ventura		150+	Plaza Park, E Thompson Blvd
California	Visalia		6	Tulare County Superior Court, S. Mooney Blvd
California	Yucca Valley		55	corner of Twentynine Palms Highway and Old Woman Springs Road
Colorado	Aspen		30+	Paepcke Park
Colorado	Boulder		2,000+	Boulder County Courthouse - march thru Pearl Street Mall and downtown Boulder along Broadway & Canyon. State Rep. Edie Hooton (D-Boulder) was present
Colorado	Carbondale			A rally was held outside The Goat Kitchen & Bar on Cowen Drive, followed by a march down Rte 133 & Euclid Ave to Sopris Park.
Colorado	Colorado Springs		500	Acacia Park
Colorado	Denver		4,000 - 6,000	Civic Center Park, outside the Capitol Building. State Rep Kyle Mullica was present with his family. A handful of counter-protesters were also present, then left before the ralliers starting marching through the city.
Colorado	Durango		100+	Buckley Park - La Plata County Courthouse
Colorado	Edwards			Edwards Rest Area & roundabout, at Edwards Access Rd
Colorado	Fort Collins		300	Hundreds gathered at Old Town Square; state Reps. Cathy Kipp and Andrew Boesenecker spoke to the crowd.
Colorado	Greeley			Weld County Courthouse, 901 9th Ave
Colorado	Longmont			People lined the all the sidewalks near the intersection of 6th and Main Sts. State Rep. Karen McCormick was seen greeting the crowd.
Colorado	Montrose			Old County Courthouse, S 1st Street
Colorado	Pueblo			corner of Rte 50 & N Elizabeth St (outside Big K-Mart parking lot)
Colorado	Steamboat Springs		250	(5/15) Bud Werner Memorial Library - historic Routt County Courthouse lawn
Connecticut	Danbury		few dozen	(5/15) Danbury Library Plaza, 170 Main St; Lt. Gov. Susan Bysiewicz attended the rally.
Connecticut	Darien		100+	Darien Town Hall; state Rep. Matt Blumenthal and state Sen. Will Haskell spoke at the rally.
Connecticut	Guilford		300	Guilford Town Green, Broad Street. Attendees included Lt. Gov. Susan Bysiewicz, state Rep Sean Scanlon and state Sen Christine Cohen.
Connecticut	Hartford		several hundred	On Saturday, May 14, several dozen gathered for a rally at the Connecticut State Capitol. The next day, an even bigger rally of several hundred was formed at the same spot, followed by a march to the Connecticut Supreme Court.
Connecticut	Litchfield		130-150	Litchfield Town Green
Connecticut	New Haven		dozens	New Haven Green, between Temple St. and Church St.
Connecticut	New London			Soldiers and Sailors Monument - courthouse
Connecticut	New Milford		60-70	New Milford Town Green, 10 Main St
Connecticut	Stamford		300	(5/15) Hundreds rallied outside the Stamford/Norwalk Judicial District Courthouse. Speakers included Lt. Gov. Susan Bysiewicz, Attorney Gen. William Tong, state Rep. Matt Blumenthal and Stamford Mayor Caroline Simmons.
Connecticut	Westport			Ruth Steinkraus Cohen Memorial Bridge.
Delaware	Georgetown		several hundred	The Circle
Delaware	Wilmington		300+	Tubman-Garrett Riverfront Park, Rosa Parks Dr
Florida	Clermont			Center Lake Park; four counter-protesters showed up.
Florida	Delray Beach		500	Old School Square, N Swinton Ave. US Senate candidate Allen Ellison spoke at the rally.
Florida	Flagler Beach		hundreds	Wadsworth Park - bridge
Florida	Fort Lauderdale		2,500	Federal Courthouse; supporters lined several blocks along Broward Blvd, drawing continual honks of support from motorists. US Rep. & candidate for Governor Charlie Crist attended the rally.
Florida	Fort Myers		200+	At Lee County Clerk of Court, hundreds of abortion and anti-abortion advocates turned out for the protest, the latter side consisting of religious leaders, local politicians and members of the Proud Boys. Confrontations during the three-hour event along Dr. Martin Luther King Jr. Boulevard were broken up by Fort Myers Police and private security officers.
Florida	Gainesville		750	Bo Diddley Plaza - Cora P. Roberson Park
Florida	Jacksonville		hundreds	Duval County Courthouse. Florida State Reps Angie Nixon & Tracie Davis were at the rally.
Florida	Key West		100	Bayview Park
Florida	Lakeland			Munn Park
Florida	Melbourne			corner of Stadium Pkwy & Judge Fran Jamieson Way, outside Harry T. and Harriette V. Moore Justice Center
Florida	Miami		couple thousand	Ives Estates Park; FL Agriculture Commissioner & gubernatorial candidate Nikki Fried spoke at the event.
Florida	Mount Dora			event hosted by Lake County Florida Democrats
Florida	Ocala		150+	intersection of Silver Springs Boulevard and South Pine Ave
Florida	Orlando		thousands	Orlando City Hall - Federal Courthouse. State Rep. Anna Eskamani spoke to the crowd. A small group of pro-lifers was also present.
Florida	Ormond Beach		200	Granada Bridge, Cassen Park
Florida	Sarasota		hundreds	Planned Parenthood location on Central Ave - Rosemary District
Florida	St. Augustine		5	Base of the Bridge of Lions
Florida	St. Petersburg			St. Petersburg City Hall
Florida	Stuart			Roosevelt Bridge
Florida	Tallahassee		several hundred	A rally was held on the steps of Florida State Capitol Building, followed by a march on the sidewalks encompassing the Capitol complex, which included the Florida Supreme Court building. State Sen. Loranne Ausley spoke at the rally.
Florida	Tampa		1,000+	Joe Chillura Courthouse Square - Curtis Hixon Park
Florida	The Villages		300	Lake Sumter Landing Market Square
Florida	Viera		hundreds	outside the Moore Justice Center
Florida	West Palm Beach		1,200	Meyer Amphitheater - Datura Street & North Flagler Drive. Speakers included US Rep. Lois Frankel, state Sen. Lori Berman & state Rep. Jervonte Edmonds.
(Georgia (U.S. state)) Georgia	Atlanta		3,500	Hundreds packed Liberty Plaza at the Georgia State Capitol. US Rep. Nikema Williams & state Sen. Nan Orrock both attended. A dozen counter-protesters stood on a nearby sidewalk.
(Georgia (U.S. state)) Georgia	Columbus			US Post Office & Court House
(Georgia (U.S. state)) Georgia	Savannah		several hundred	Several abortion rights events happened in Savannah. Over 100 people rallied at Chatham County Courthouse on Montgomery St; Savannah Mayor Van Johnson spoke to the crowd. Meanwhile, hundreds more gathtered at Forsyth Park Fountain, then marched along Bull Street through Downtown Savannah.
(Georgia (U.S. state)) Georgia	Statesboro		dozens	(5/15) Bulloch County Courthouse
Hawaii	Hilo		100+	Kamehameha Ave outside Bayfront Park and Wailoa Park, in front of the Kamehameha Statue.
Hawaii	Honolulu		700	Hundreds gathered at the intersection of Kalakaua Blvd & Kapahulu Ave, outside Honolulu Zoo Park, then marched within the Waikiki area; one anti-abortion protester showed up.
Hawaii	Kahului (Maui)		420	sidewalk facing West Ka'ahumanu Avenue, outside Queen Ka'ahumanu Center in front of Old Sears Building
Hawaii	Kailua-Kona		50	Queen Ka'ahumanu Hwy, south of Henry Street
Hawaii	Lihue			Kaua'i Community College - Main Entrance Sidewalk, 3-1901 Kaumualii Hwy
Idaho	Boise		5,000	Thousands gathered at the Idaho Statehouse. A smaller right-to-life rally took place at the same spot later in the day.
Idaho	Coeur d'Alene		300+	corner of 19th Street & Sherman Ave - McEuen Park
Idaho	Moscow		120-140	East City Park, 900 E 3rd St
Idaho	Pocatello		200	Pocatello City Hall
Illinois	Carbondale			Carbondale Civic Center, 200 S Illinois Ave
Illinois	Chicago		2,500 - 10,000	Several events were held in Chicago on Saturday, May 14. At least several thousand gathered at Union Park, then marched around the city, through the Loop. Speakers included Amy Eshleman (wife of Chicago Mayor Lori Lightfoot), Lt. Gov. Juliana Stratton & US Reps Jan Schakowsky & Sean Casten (the latter of whom brought along his teenage daughter). A second event at Wrigley Square in Millennium Park attracted a few hundred people.
Illinois	Elgin			intersection of Kimball Street and Grove Avenue
Illinois	Geneva		100+	Kane County Courthouse; US Rep Bill Foster spoke at the rally.
Illinois	Normal			One Normal Plaza, 601-691 E Lincoln St
Illinois	Plainfield		hundreds	Settler's Park Amphitheater
Illinois	Rockford		200+	Women's Suffrage Plaza; Rockford Mayor Tom McNamara spoke at the rally. Tensions sparked when some counter-protestors came to the event with a megaphone. After some confrontation, two police officers came between the two sides.
Illinois	Springfield		80-100	(5/15) Old State Capitol
Indiana	Bloomington		dozens	outside Monroe County Courthouse, W Kirkwood Ave
Indiana	Columbus			Columbus City Hall - Bartholomew County Courthouse
Indiana	Crown Point			Courthouse Square, 220 S Main St
Indiana	Fort Wayne		hundreds	Allen County Courthouse Green, South Calhoun St; several dozen pro-life activists stood across the street.
Indiana	Hobart		55	First Unitarian Universalist Church of Hobart - walk through downtown; US Rep. Frank J. Mrvan spoke at the event.
Indiana	Indianapolis		300+	(5/15) A "Defend Roe" rally was held at the Indiana State Capitol.
Indiana	Lafayette		50+	Margerum Fountain, West Lafayette - Tippecanoe County Courthouse
Indiana	Muncie			Delaware County Building; Hammond, IN Mayor & candidate for US Senate Thomas McDermott spoke to the crowd.
Indiana	Noblesville			Hamilton County Government and Judicial Center
Iowa	Cedar Rapids		hundreds	Green Square Park - across the river and back. State Rep. Liz Bennett attended the rally.
Iowa	Dubuque		75	About 50 people gathered outside Dubuque County Courthouse; their ranks increased to 75 as they marched to Town Clock Plaza, where 20 pro-life advocates were present.
Iowa	Iowa City		200+	University of Iowa Pentacrest - Iowa Ave, Gilbert St & Ped Mall
Kansas	Topeka		75+	(5/15) Kansas State House
Kansas	Wichita		~80	Women's March -Air Capital- Wichita Kansas held two rallies over the weekend. On Saturday May 14, a few dozen people stood outside the Federal Courthouse; on Sunday May 15, at least 40 people gathered at A. Price Woodard Park. On both occasions, protesters spoke out not only against the leaked SCOTUS draft opinion re Roe v. Wade, but a proposed Kansas abortion-restriction amendment scheduled for a vote on August 2.
Kentucky	Bowling Green		25-30	Natcher Federal Courthouse
Kentucky	Frankfort		hundreds	(5/15) Kentucky Capital building
Kentucky	Lexington		hundreds	Robert F. Stephens Courthouse Plaza
Kentucky	Louisville		2,000	Hundreds gathered outside Planned Parenthood's Louisville location.
Louisiana	Lafayette		100	Parc Putnam, outside federal courthouse on Lafayette St
Louisiana	New Orleans		hundreds	Duncan Plaza (next to City Hall)
Louisiana	Shreveport		45+	police station - Caddo Parish Courthouse
Maine	Bangor		hundreds	Gov. Janet Mills arrived at the rally at Bass Park, outside Cross Insurance Center, after she spoke at the Democratic state convention. Mills told both delegates and abortion rights supporters that, as their Governor, she would not allow any rollback of women's rights in the state of Maine even if Roe v. Wade were to be overturned.
Maine	Bar Harbor			Village Green, corner of Main St & Mt. Desert St
Maine	Brunswick			(5/15) Town Mall & Gazebo, Maine Street
Maine	Bucksport			Veterans Memorial Park
Maine	Portland		500	Lincoln Park
Maine	Rockland		200	corner of Park Street & Main Street, at Walgreens
Maryland	Aspen Hill			intersection of Georgia Ave & Connecticut Ave
Maryland	Baltimore		hundreds	War Memorial Plaza, in front of Baltimore City Hall - William Donald Schaefer Building
Maryland	Frederick		hundreds	Square Corner (E. Patrick St. & N. Market St.)
Maryland	Leisure World			Georgia Ave near the intersection of Rossmoor Blvd.
Maryland	Westminster			outside Carroll County Public Library, 50 E Main St
Massachusetts	Attleboro		75	Dozens of people stood single file, with signs, in front of the Attleboro District Court House on North Main Street; attending the rally were US Rep. Jake Auchincloss and state Rep. Adam Scanlon.
Massachusetts	Boston		several thousand	Two rallies were held in downtown Boston, each followed by a march. At noon, the first event took place at the Parkman Bandstand in the Boston Common, with thousands in attendance; speakers included US Sen Ed Markey and Massachusetts Attorney General Maura Healey, the latter currently running for governor. Protesters then marched through Downtown Crossing and up to the State House. Meanwhile, a smaller rally took place in Copley Square at 2 pm, with a few hundred people, who then marched up Boylston St to where the first event had started, at the Bandstand.
Massachusetts	Concord		several hundred	Monument Square, Main Street, Concord Center
Massachusetts	Duxbury			First Parish Church Unitarian, 842 Tremont St
Massachusetts	Falmouth		100 - 120	Falmouth Village Green, Main St
Massachusetts	Hyannis		200	Hyannis Airport Rotary, 545 Iyannough Rd
Massachusetts	Marblehead		16+	Marblehead Community Center
Massachusetts	Martha's Vineyard		at least 50	Vineyard Haven's Five Corners
Massachusetts	Newburyport		500	Market Square (corner of State St. and Water/Merrimac St.)
Massachusetts	Northampton		hundreds	At Northampton City Hall, speakers included US Rep. Jim McGovern, state Sen. Jo Comerford and state Rep. Lindsay Sabadosa (D-Northampton). A second rally was planned at Pulaski Park.
Massachusetts	Orleans		100	Orleans Rotary, 6 MA-6A
Massachusetts	Plymouth			rally held at Plymouth Rock, 79 Water St
Massachusetts	Provincetown		7-10	A community visibility event was hosted at Womencrafts store on Commercial St, where visitors could make their own signs and display them anywhere in town, or borrow chalk to write messages on the sidewalk.
Massachusetts	Scituate		~50	rally outside Scituate Town Hall
Massachusetts	Wareham		65	Memorial Town Hall, 54 Marion Rd
Massachusetts	Worcester		300+	Worcester City Hall; rally led by Worcester-based Independent Socialist Group.
Michigan	Alpena		100	(5/15) Alpena County Courthouse; about a dozen anti-abortion activists also showed up.
Michigan	Ann Arbor		2,000 - 4,000	University of Michigan's Diag; speakers included US Rep. Debbie Dingell & US Sen. Debbie Stabenow.
Michigan	Big Rapids			outside Big Rapids Middle School / Hemlock St
Michigan	Detroit		close to 1,000	Theodore Levin United States Courthouse, 231 W Lafayette Blvd - Woodward Avenue - courthouse
Michigan	Flint		250	Flat Lot, E Kearsley St - Genesee County Courthouse
Michigan	Grand Rapids		few hundred	At Calder Plaza outside Grand Rapids City Hall, Michigan Attorney General Dana Nessel told the crowd that if Roe v. Wade was overturned, she wouldn't enforce the state's 1931 abortion ban trigger law. A group of anti-abortion counter-protesters also showed up, prompting some confrontation.
Michigan	Houghton		40	Portage Lake Lift Bridge
Michigan	Lansing		700	(5/15) Michigan State Capitol
Michigan	Muskegon		100	Hackley Square
Michigan	Petoskey		120+	200 E. Lake St
Michigan	Saginaw		~50	Saginaw County Courthouse lawn. A dozen abortion opponents were stationed across Court Street near Borchard Park.
Michigan	Sault Ste. Marie		30	Island Books & Crafts
Michigan	Traverse City		hundreds	Open Space off Grandview Parkway
Minnesota	Bemidji		50	Protesters lined Paul Bunyan Drive with their signs.
Minnesota	Duluth			Duluth City Hall; state Rep Jen Schultz attended the rally.
Minnesota	Rochester		40+	Olmsted County Government Center
Minnesota	St. Cloud		300	Lake George Pavilion (near Division Street) - Stearns County Courthouse
Minnesota	St. Paul		1,000+	Hundreds of protesters filled a 150-yard length of Charles Avenue from curb to curb, outside Planned Parenthood St. Paul Vandalia Health Center. Speakers included Lt. Gov Peggy Flanagan and US Senators Amy Klobuchar & Tina Smith. A small group of counter-protesters also stood by.
Mississippi	Jackson		dozen	Protesters stood outside the governor's mansion on Sunday, May 15.
Missouri	Columbia		300	Daniel Boone City Building, 701 E Broadway. Those in attendance included US Senate candidate Spencer Toder (D-MO) and state Rep. David Tyson Smith (D-MO).
Missouri	Kansas City		300 - 1,000	Mill Creek Park - Country Club Plaza
Missouri	Maryville		60	Nodaway County Courthouse
Missouri	Springfield		350	Park Central Square. Missouri House Minority Leader Crystal Quade spoke at the event.
Missouri	St. Louis		hundreds	At Kiener Plaza, an Abortion Now rally was led by Advocates of Planned Parenthood of the St. Louis Region and Southwest Missouri (also in charge of the Springfield, MO rally). Speakers included St. Louis Mayor Tishaura Jones & US Rep. Cori Bush
Montana	Billings		several hundred	Yellowstone County Courthouse
Montana	Helena		300+	(5/15) Montana State Capitol
Montana	Kalispell			Depot Park
Montana	Missoula		100+	Dozens marched from the Missoula County Courthouse on W Broadway St to Farmer's Market.
Nebraska	Lincoln		hundreds	(5/15) Nebraska State Capitol; state Sen. Patty Pansing Brooks spoke at the rally.
Nebraska	Omaha		1,000	Omaha City Hall - march downtown; state Sen. Jen Day was present for the rally.
Nevada	Carson City		30+	South Carson Street outside the Nevada State Capitol & Legislative Building.
Nevada	Henderson			The Shoppes on the Parkway parking lot, 3540 St Rose Pkwy
Nevada	Las Vegas		2,000+	Hundreds gathered at Sunset Park. Gov. Steve Sisolak, Lt. Gov. Lisa Cano Burkhead, NV Attorney General Aaron Ford and US Rep. Dina Titus spoke for about an hour combined and were met with cheers from the crowd.
Nevada	Reno		300	Hundreds rallied at Reno City Plaza, in front of the Believe Sign. Speakers included US Sen. Catherine Cortez Masto, state assemblyman Sarah Peters and state Senate candidate Nnedi Stephens.
New Hampshire	Concord			(5/15) NH State House, N Main St
New Hampshire	Portsmouth		hundreds	Prescott Park
New Jersey	Hillsdale			Veterans Park, 143 Broadway
New Jersey	Metuchen		~100	Rev. Dr. Martin Luther King Jr. Memorial Park. Speakers included Metuchen Mayor Jonathan Busch, US Rep Frank Pallone and NJ First Lady Tammy Murphy.
New Jersey	Montclair			
New Jersey	Morristown		hundreds	Morristown Green, N Park Pl - march downtown
New Jersey	Princeton		1,000+	Despite heavy rain, hundreds of people stayed for a rally at Hinds Plaza, including US Rep. Bonnie Watson Coleman.
New Jersey	Red Bank		several hundred	Red Bank train station - Monmouth St
New Jersey	Wayne		100	Lakeland Unitarian Universalist Fellowship, Parish Drive
New Jersey	Westfield		several hundred	Mindowaskin Park. Fanwood Mayor Colleen Mahr spoke at the rally
New Mexico	Alamogordo		45+	sign holding event at North White Sands Boulevard & East 10th Street
New Mexico	Albuquerque		600+ (total)	Hundreds showed up for a peaceful rally at Morningside Park; a second rally at Tiguex Park included state Sen. Antoinette Sedillo Lopez. Counter-protesters entered the latter rally, resulting in a few confrontations without injury or police intervention.
New Mexico	Las Cruces		200+	Demonstrators gathered at Albert Johnson Park near City Hall, and held signs at the corner of Main St and Picacho Ave. Another rally was planned at the United States District Court on North Church Street.
New Mexico	Santa Fe			The Roundhouse (NM State Capitol); Speaker of the NM House of Representatives Brian Egolf joined the rally.
New York	Albany		hundreds	Upper Hudson Planned Parenthood organized a rally on Central Ave; Albany Mayor Kathy Sheehan was present.
New York	Beacon		30+	Polhill Park, Main St & South Ave
New York	Binghamton		hundreds	Federal Building and U.S. Courthouse, 15 Henry St
New York	Buffalo		1,000	A rally & march took place in the morning at Niagara Square; organizers declared it "the biggest rally they've ever seen come together in such a short amount of time." Hours later that afternoon, media attention swiftly shifted to a mass shooting at a supermarket.
New York	Corning		80-100	Centerway Square
New York	Glens Falls		100+	Glens Falls City Park; Assemblywoman Carrie Woerner & congressional candidate for 21st District Matt Castelli spoke at the rally.
New York	Hudson		200+	Planned Parenthood Health Center, Columbia St. Hudson Mayor Kamal Johnson spoke to the crowd.
New York	Ithaca		150	Ithaca Commons Bernie Milton Pavilion; speakers included acting Mayor of Ithaca Laura Lewis, Democratic congressional candidate Vanessa Fajans-Turner and state Senate candidate Leslie Danks Burke.
New York	Kingston		400+	Academy Green Park - Ulster County Office Building and the Old Dutch Church - Kingston Farmer's Market; event sponsored by Hudson Valley Strong and IndivisibleUlster. Speakers included US Rep (& lieutenant governor-designate) Antonio Delgado and state Sen. Michelle Hinchey.
New York	Liberty		dozen	LaPolt Park, N Main St
New York	New York City		10,000	Cadman Plaza, Brooklyn - Brooklyn Bridge - Foley Square, Manhattan. NYC Mayor Eric Adams both spoke at the Brooklyn rally and participated in the march, as did US Senators Chuck Schumer and Kirsten Gillibrand, US Rep. Jerry Nadler and NY Attorney General Letitia James. Also participating were actresses Laura Dern, Julia Louis-Dreyfus and Amber Tamblyn, singer Cyndi Lauper, model Christy Turlington and "Top Chef" host Padma Lakshmi. Another rally, organized by Rise Up 4 Abortion Rights, was held in Union Square.
New York	Riverhead		200+	Suffolk County Courthouse
New York	Rochester		150-250	Washington Square Park
New York	Saratoga Springs		200	(May 8) "Our Bodies Our Choice" march from Congress Park to Broadway; event organized by students of Saratoga Springs High School and Argyle High School.
New York	Seneca Falls		100+	(5/13) Women's Rights National Historical Park
New York	Sleepy Hollow / Tarrytown		400	rally held at Patriots Park, Broadway on the border between Sleepy Hollow and Tarrytown
New York	Syracuse		300	University United Methodist Church, E Genesee St
New York	Troy			120 Hoosick St, outside Hudson River Commons
New York	Utica		250+	YWCA, Rutger St - Nurses' Candlelight Park, next to Planned Parenthood on Genesee St. 25 pro-life activists stood across the street from the march.
New York	White Plains		hundreds	People gathered at Renaissance Plaza, near the Harriet Tubman Journey to Freedom statue, then marched to the MLK statue outside Westchester County Courthouse; event organized by Women on 20s.
North Carolina	Asheville		200-400	Hundreds gathered at Pack Square Park. Another event was planned at the Art Museum.
North Carolina	Charlotte		1,000+	A rally was held at Marshall Park; state Representative and candidate for state Senate Rachel Hunt addressed the crowd. People then marched through Uptown Charlotte, blocking Tryon and College Streets at one point.
North Carolina	Fayetteville			Market House, Gillespie St
North Carolina	Greensboro		200+	Government Plaza on 110 South Greene Street
North Carolina	Hendersonville		hundreds	People lined the streets of Boyd Park on N. Main Street (North End) with abortion-rights signs. One counter-protester stood with an "Abortion is Murder" sign.
North Carolina	Raleigh		1,000+	Hundreds of protesters gathered at the N.C. State Capitol, then marched around the Legislative Building on West Jones Street & N.C. Supreme Court. When they returned to the capitol, they encountered a smaller Students for Life counter-protest across the street.
North Carolina	Salisbury		dozens	Rowan County Government, W Innes St; former Salisbury Mayor Al Heggins attended the rally.
North Carolina	Waynesville		50	Haywood County Courthouse
North Carolina	Winston-Salem		nearly 400	West 4th Street & Spring St. - Ward Federal Courthouse; event organized by Triad Women's March. Along the march route, the crowd was accompanied by four counter-protesters; both sides remained peaceful.
North Dakota	Bismarck		hundreds	ND State Capitol
North Dakota	Fargo		several hundred	Fargo City Hall
North Dakota	Grand Forks		100+	Independence Park, Demers Avenue
North Dakota	Minot			Oak Park Shelter 9
Ohio	Akron		40+	John F. Seiberling Federal Building, S Main Street
Ohio	Cincinnati		4,000+	A rally was held at Fountain Square; speakers included Cincinnati Mayor Aftab Pureval and state Rep. Catherine Ingram.
Ohio	Cleveland		1,000	Hundreds gathered at Willard Park; state Rep. Emilia Sykes spoke to the crowd.
Ohio	Columbus		1,000+	Hundreds filled the west lawn of the Ohio State House to protest for abortion rights, while a group of anti-abortion activists, Created Equal, stood against the building with their signs obscured by those of the crowd.
Ohio	Dayton		400	People across the Miami Valley gathered for a rally and march around Courthouse Square; five anti-abortion rights counter-protesters were also present.
Ohio	Toledo		100-150	Protesters lined the sidewalk along Secor Road, outside the Chase Bank parking lot.
Ohio	Wilmington		24	corner Main and South South Streets
Ohio	Xenia			events held at Courthouse Square & Greene County Democratic Headquarters
Ohio	Youngstown		200 - 350	Mahoning County Courthouse Steps. State Rep. Michele Lepore-Hagan spoke at the rally.
Oklahoma	Enid		25 - 50	First Amendment forum, S Grand Ave and W Park Ave
Oklahoma	Muskogee		60	Martin Luther King Center - Ed Edmondshon Courthouse
Oklahoma	Norman			201 S Jones Ave
Oklahoma	Oklahoma City		hundreds	Oklahoma State Capitol
Oklahoma	Stillwater		20-30	Payne County Courthouse
Oklahoma	Tulsa		hundreds	march from the Center of the Universe (1 S Boston Ave) to Tulsa County Courthouse on S Denver Ave
Oregon	Ashland		2,000+	Hundreds gathered at the Ashland Public Library on Siskiyou Blvd and marched down Main Street to the Ashland Plaza. State Rep Pam Marsh was among the participants.
Oregon	Bend		hundreds	Drake Park - Wall St and Newport Ave
Oregon	Coos Bay		70+	Coos Bay Boardwalk, 200 S Bay Shore Dr
Oregon	Corvallis		260+	Oregon State University Memorial Union, 2501 SW Jefferson Way - Corvallis City Hall
Oregon	Eugene		1,000+	Hundreds of abortion rights activists gathered at Wayne Lyman Morse Federal Courthouse; state Sen President Pro Tem James Manning Jr. spoke at the rally. A handful of pro-life activists also showed up. After the rally, people marched to the University of Oregon campus, where a larger rally of over 1,000 was held at the Erb Memorial Union.
Oregon	Grants Pass			Josephine County Courthouse
Oregon	Hood River		100	"Salmon Fountain" Plaza, 2nd & State Streets
Oregon	Portland		thousands	Over 1,000 people gathered for at rally at Chapman Square, in front of the Multnomah County Justice Center. Prior to the rally, Gov. Kate Brown and US Sen Jeff Merkley held a news conference with healthcare professionals and other political leaders. After 90 minutes of speeches, protesters then marched as far as Powell's Books on West Burnside Street and back to Chapman Square.
Oregon	Salem		400	(5/15) Oregon State Capitol - downtown Salem
Oregon	Sherwood		100	Cannery Square, SW Pine St - Sherwood Blvd - Highway 99W
Pennsylvania	Bethlehem		150	Payrow Plaza, 10 E Church St
Pennsylvania	Carlisle			1 Courthouse Sq
Pennsylvania	Clarion		60	The abortion-rights rally, hosted by Indivisible We Rise – West Central Pennsylvania, stood outside the Clarion County Courthouse, while a rally of 30 anti-abortion supporters, organized by the Clarion County Republican Committee, stood across the street outside Veterans Memorial Park.
Pennsylvania	Doylestown		1,000	(5/15) Bucks County Courthouse, E Court St; PA Attorney General & gubernatorial candidate Josh Shapiro spoke at the rally.
Pennsylvania	Harrisburg		1,000+	Capitol Steps, 501 N 3rd St. Speakers included Gov. Tom Wolf and state Sen. Vincent Hughes.
Pennsylvania	Honesdale		50+	Fred Miller pavilion, 640 Main St
Pennsylvania	Indiana		93	IRMC Park - Indiana County Court House
Pennsylvania	King of Prussia		dozen	109 E Dekalb Pike, corner of Dekalb Pike (202) & Henderson Road
Pennsylvania	Milford		dozens	Pike County District Courthouse, 506 Broad St
Pennsylvania	Philadelphia		thousands	Philadelphia City Hall (Dilworth Plaza); hundreds of pro-abortion rights supporters spanned the sidewalk and all the lanes of John F. Kennedy Boulevard at its intersection with Broad Street. Meanwhile, the Pro-Life Union of Greater Philadelphia also had a rally w/ hundreds of people.
Pennsylvania	Pittsburgh		1,000 - 1,500	Pittsburgh Mayor Ed Gainey was among the speakers who addressed the crowd at the City County Building. The demonstration marched through the streets of downtown Pittsburgh and ended in Market Square.
Pennsylvania	Scranton		dozens	(5/15) Courthouse Square
Pennsylvania	Smethport		14	McKean County Court House
Pennsylvania	West Chester		400	Historic Chester County Courthouse, 2 North High Street. Speakers included West Chester Mayor Lillian DeBaptiste, Downingtown Mayor Phil Dague, US Rep. Chrissy Houlahan.
Pennsylvania	Wilkes Barre		130+	Over a hundred protesters lined River Street in front of the Luzerne County Court House. Some of the protesters had made their way over to River Street from an earlier abortion-rights rally held on Public Square.
Rhode Island	Newport			Newport City Hall, 43 Broadway
Rhode Island	Providence		400 - 600	Hundreds gathered outside the Rhode Island Supreme Court for a rally, after which 200 marched to the Rhose Island State House.
South Carolina	Bluffton		~50	event held on Bluffton Parkway outside Beaufort County Government Building
South Carolina	Charleston		several hundred	Marion Square
South Carolina	Columbia		at least 100 total	On Monday, May 9, a dozen people gathered outside the SC State House. The following weekend saw increased turnout at the same spot.
South Carolina	Greenville		500+	Main St.
South Dakota	Rapid City		50 - 70	Dozens stood outside Pennington County Courthouse, St Joseph St. A second event was planned at Main Street Square.
South Dakota	Sioux Falls		100+	Van Eps Park
Tennessee	Chattanooga		150 - 250	Miller Park, Market St - Chattanooga City Hall
Tennessee	Cookeville		dozens	Putnam County Courthouse, E Spring St
Tennessee	Knoxville		hundreds	Krutch Park - downtown.
Tennessee	Memphis		300	Ida B. Wells Plaza, near Beale St
Tennessee	Nashville		2,000	Legislative Plaza - Federal Courthouse on Church St Several pro-life advocates were also present.
Texas	Abilene		80	Abilene City Hall
Texas	Austin		3,800+ (total)	Thousands marched from Texas AFL-CIO headquarters to the Texas State Capitol; troopers estimated close to 3,500 at the rally. Speakers included US Rep Lloyd Doggett, US Rep. candidate Greg Casar, state Reps. Donna Howard and Gina Hinojosa, and former state Senator Wendy Davis. Meanwhile, several hundred more abortion rights supporters marched from Buford Tower to the Austin Convention Center, where the American Freedom Tour, featuring former President Donald Trump, was being held.
Texas	Beaumont		50	Jefferson County Democratic Party headquarters
Texas	Brownsville		100+	Linear Park
Texas	Dallas		thousands	Dallas City Hall
Texas	El Paso		hundreds	U.S. Federal Courthouse - San Jacinto Plaza
Texas	Fort Worth		almost 1,000	Tarrant County Courthouse
Texas	Frisco		200	Frisco Square Pavilion; US House candidate Iro Omere spoke at the rally.
Texas	Houston		hundreds	Hundreds marched to Houston City Hall; a group of anti-abortion advocates also turned out. Another event was planned at the Discovery Green, 1500 McKinney St
Texas	Lubbock		40-50	Timothy Cole Memorial Park
Texas	Midland			Centennial Park, 200 W Wall St
Texas	New Braunfels			Main Plaza
Texas	San Angelo		40	Tom Green County Court House, 112 W Beauregard Ave
Texas	San Antonio		3,000	Attendance at a rally at Main Plaza, outside San Fernando Cathedral, grew from several hundred to well over 1,000. Speakers included San Antonio Mayor Ron Nirenberg, state Rep. Ina Minjarez and Bexar County Judge Nelson Wolff. Thousands of people then marched down Commerce St. and Santa Rosa St. past Market Square before heading back to the Main Plaza and arriving at the Federal Courthouse.
Texas	Sherman		75	Grayson County Courthouse
Utah	Logan		100+	Cache County Courthouse - Center Street
Utah	Ogden		~100	Ogden Municipal Building, Washington Blvd; state Rep. Angela Romero spoke at the rally.
Utah	Park City		200+	rally in City Park. Park City Mayor Nann Worel spoke at the event.
Utah	Salt Lake City		2,000	Utah State Capitol
Vermont	Montpelier		3,000+	Outside the Vermont State House, US Sen. Bernie Sanders spoke before the crowd; also present were US Rep Peter Welch and 2nd-time candidate for governor Brenda Siegel. One rally topic was Vermont's Reproductive Liberty Amendment, which would be on the ballot in the November mid-term elections.
Virginia	Bristol		dozens	Bristol Virginia-Tennessee Slogan Sign, State St
Virginia	Charlottesville		hundreds	Federal Courthouse, W Main St - Free Speech Wall
Virginia	Galax			U.S. 58 & North Main Street
Virginia	Lexington		40+	South Main Street & West Washington Street
Virginia	Norfolk		100+	Walter E. Hoffman United States Courthouse, Granby St
Virginia	Richmond		2,500	Thousands gathered at Monroe Park for a rally, then marched down Broad Street to Virginia State Capitol.
Virginia	Roanoke		200	Poff Federal Building; protesters held signs in rainy weather. State Senator John Edwards attended the rally.
Virginia	Staunton		60-80	Augusta County Circuit Court
Virginia	Virginia Beach		400	Virginia Beach City Hall, Courthouse Dr. #1
Virginia	Williamsburg		hundreds	Williamsburg James City County Courthouse
Washington	Bellingham		hundreds	Waypoint Park - Bellingham City Hall; state Rep. Alicia Rule & state Sen. Sharon Shewmake spoke at the event.
Washington	Everett		450	Snohomish County Courthouse Plaza & Amphitheatre
Washington	Ellensburg			Central Washington University
Washington	Gig Harbor		250+	corner of Point Fosdick Drive & Olympic Drive
Washington	Kirkland		hundreds	Kirkland City Hall
Washington	Longview		12	R.A. Long Park
Washington	Lynnwood			64th Avenue West & 196th Street Southwest
Washington	Mount Vernon		400	Skagit County Superior Courthouse, at intersection of Third & Kincaid Streets
Washington	Olympia		2,000	State Capitol, 416 Sid Snyder Ave SW, 11th Ave and Capital Blvd by the WWII Memorial
Washington	Port Townsend		200-300	Port Townsend Food Coop / Water Street to the Washington State Ferry dock
Washington	Pullman		50	Cougar Plaza
Washington	Raymond		35	intersection of Heath St & Hwy 101
Washington	Renton			intersection of N 10th St & Logan Ave N
Washington	Richland		200+	Hundreds gathered at John Dam Plaza, lining both sides of George Washington Way.
Washington	Seattle		4,000+	Thousands gathered at Cal Anderson Park; US Rep. Suzan DelBene was the first to speak before the crowd. After the rally, more than 1,000 people marched through Pike Place Market. Meanwhile, 'Refuse Fascism Seattle' held a 'Rise Up 4 Abortion Rights' protest that started at Capitol Hill's Seattle Central College Plaza along Broadway Ave.
Washington	Sequim		25-30	corner of N Sequim Ave and E Washington St
Washington	Spokane		1,000	The Childhood Express "Red Wagon," Riverfront Park
Washington	Suquamish		400	Participants gathered at the west end of Agate Pass Bridge on Highway 305 at the intersection around the Clearwater Casino. US Rep. Derek Kilmer and his Democratic opponent, Rebecca Parson, visited with the protesters.
Washington	Tacoma			U.S. District Courthouse, 1717 Pacific Ave
Washington	Twisp			Twisp Commons, 135 Johnson St
Washington	Vancouver		300	Federal Courthouse, 1111 Main St
Washington	Walla Walla		couple hundred	South 1st Avenue & East Main Street
Washington	Wenatchee		300	Memorial Park, near Chelan County courthouse
Washington	Yakima		30+	Millennium Plaza, 22 S 3rd St
West Virginia	Morgantown			Monongalia County Courthouse
Wisconsin	Ashland		20+	Ashland Bandshell, Lakeshore Drive
Wisconsin	Green Bay		40-50	Leicht Memorial Park, Dousman St - Brown County Courthouse
Wisconsin	Kenosha		200	(5/15) A rally was held at Civic Center Park; speakers included state Reps. Tip McGuire & Tod Ohnstad, state Sen. Bob Wirch & US Rep. candidate Ann Roe (running for Bryan Steil's seat).
Wisconsin	Madison		1,500	Hundreds gathered outside the Wisconsin State Capitol Building. Gov. Tony Evers, US Sen. Tammy Baldwin and state Sen. Melissa Agard addressed the crowd. One major issue of concern was the state's own 1849 anti-abortion law - unenforceable since the landmark 1973 ruling - that could be "triggered" back into effect once again.
Wisconsin	Milwaukee			Ziedler Union Square - march downtown
Wisconsin	Minocqua		150	rally held at Minocqua Veteran's Park, followed by a march up Rte 51. US Senate candidate Tom Nelson spoke at the rally before heading to Wausau.
Wisconsin	Muskego			corner of Moorland Road and Janesville Road (Near Kohl's and Starbucks)
Wisconsin	Sauk City		60	Sauk City Bridge over the Wisconsin River, U.S. 12 & Water Street
Wisconsin	Walworth		100+	across the street from Sammy's on the Square
Wisconsin	Wausau		hundreds	A rally was held at the 400 Block; US Senate candidate Tom Nelson arrived after attending an earlier rally at Minocqua. A group of anti-abortion protesters also stood by, in prayer. After the rally, over 100 people marched from 400 Block to the Marathon County Courthouse.
Wyoming	Casper		200	Veteran's Park on Second Street - Healing Park on Conwell St, across from Wyoming Medical Center
Wyoming	Cheyenne		few dozen	in front of Depot Plaza, corner of East Lincolnway & Warren Avenue
Wyoming	Lander			Centennial Park, 209 Main Street

== Worldwide ==
Listed below are marches outside the United States in support of the 2022 "Bans Off Our Bodies" Day of Action.

Country	Locations	Photo	Approximate attendance	Notes
Australia	Sydney			Sydney CBD - Town Hall
Canada	Calgary		100+	(5/15) Calgary City Hall
Canada	Toronto			Superior Court Justice Bldg - across from the U.S. Consulate, 361 University Ave
Denmark	Copenhagen			across from the US Embassy, Copenhagen, Dag Hammarskjölds Allé 17
France	Paris			(5/15) Place du Trocadero
Germany	Berlin		50+	Brandenburg Gate, in front of the US Embassy at Pariser Platz
Germany	Düsseldorf			Konrad-Adenauer-Platz
Germany	Hamburg			US Konsulat, Alsterufer 27/28
Germany	Kaiserslautern			ZOOM meeting
Germany	Munich			Prinz-Carl-Palais Platz, across from the US Consulate Munich, von-der-Tann Strasse
Germany	Stuttgart			Kleiner Schlossplatz
Italy	Rome		21	Piazza Trilussa
Norway	Oslo			outside the US Embassy - Oslo, Morgedalsvegen 36
Spain	Barcelona			Plaça de Sant Jaume 1
Sweden	Gothenburg			Condeco, Fredsgatan 14
United Kingdom	Edinburgh		100	outside US Consolate
United Kingdom	London		hundreds	Parliament Square (next to the Suffragette Statue) - Vauxhall Bridge - US Embassy (Nine Elms)
United Kingdom	Derry (Northern Ireland)			Guildhall Square (Alliance for Choice Derry)
