= List of North Carolina A&T State University fraternities and sororities =

Roughly 1.4% of undergraduate male students and 1.2% of undergraduate female students at North Carolina Agricultural and Technical State University in Greensboro, North Carolina are members of fraternities and sororities. The first fraternity on campus was Phi Beta Sigma, chartered in 1915. The first sorority on campus was Alpha Kappa Alpha, established in January 1932. As of 2025, the Office of Greek Life recognized seven fraternities and five sororities. These fraternities and sororities are based in campus residence halls. They provide members with social activities and perform community service.

Most fraternities and sororities at N.C. A&T are governed by the National Pan-Hellenic Council (NPHC). The National Pan-Hellenic Council, collectively known as the Divine Nine, is a collaborative organization of nine historically African American, international Greek lettered fraternities and sororities. The Greek Lettered Council previously served as the governing body for the non-NPHC organizations and social fellowships.

Following is a list of North Carolina A&T State University fraternities and sororities.

== National Pan-Hellenic Council ==
Following at North Carolina A&T's members of the NPHC.

Organization	Chapter name	Chapter charter date and range	Type	Status	Ref.
Alpha Kappa Alpha	Alpha Phi	January 12, 1932	Sorority, social	Active	
Alpha Phi Alpha	Beta Epsilon	1929	Fraternity, social	Active	
Delta Sigma Theta	Alpha Mu	February 13, 1932	Sorority, social	Active	(Note: Chapter formed from the Pyramid Club (local).)
Iota Phi Theta	Zeta	1970	Fraternity, social	Active	
Kappa Alpha Psi	Alpha Nu	1933	Fraternity, social	Active	
Omega Psi Phi	Mu Psi	1927	Fraternity, social	Active	
Phi Beta Sigma	Eta	1915	Fraternity, social	Active	
Sigma Gamma Rho	Gamma	1951	Sorority, social	Active	
Zeta Phi Beta	Zeta Alpha	1934	Sorority, social	Active	

== Other organizations ==
Following are social fellowships and national fraternities and sororities that are not members of the NPHC.

Organization	Chapter name	Chapter charter date and range	Type	Status	Ref.
Alpha Phi Omega	Kappa Psi	February 13, 1953 – July 13, 1996; April 30, 2000 – January 26, 2019	Service, coed fraternity	Inactive	
Beta Phi Epsilon			Fraternity, local social	Inactive	
Chi Eta Phi	Sigma Chi Beta	April 4, 1975–2018	Profession nursing sorority	Inactive	
Gamma Tau		193x ?–19xx ?	Fraternity, local social	Inactive	
Groove Phi Groove	Aggie	1969–20xx ?	Social fellowship	Inactive	
Kappa Kappa Psi	Iota Zeta	1990	Fraternity, band	Active	
Lambda Chi Alpha	Pi-Iota	2005–2009	Fraternity, social	Inactive	
Phi Mu Alpha Sinfonia	Iota Beta	1972	Fraternity, music	Active	
Swing Phi Swing	Aggie	1971–20xx ?	Social fellowship	Inactive	
Tau Beta Sigma	Theta Zeta	1990	Sorority, service	Active	

== Notable members ==
Following are some notable members of fraternities and sororities at North Carolina A&T.

Name	Organization	Notability	Ref.
Ezell Blair Jr.	Alpha Phi Alpha	Civil rights activist and member of the Greensboro Four	
Henry Frye	Kappa Alpha Psi	Chief Justice of the North Carolina Supreme Court, North Carolina Senate, and North Carolina House of Representatives	
Ronald McNair	Omega Psi Phi	NASA astronaut and physicist	
Hilda Pinnix-Ragland	Alpha Kappa Alpha	First woman and first African American to chair the State Board of Community Colleges in North Carolina; vice president of Northern Regions Energy Delivery Services of Progress Energy Inc	
Terrence J	Omega Psi Phi	Actor and model	
Edolphus Towns	Phi Beta Sigma	United States House of Representatives	
Dick Westmoreland	Kappa Alpha Psi	Professional football player	
