= Mickey Stephens =

American politician (1944–2021)

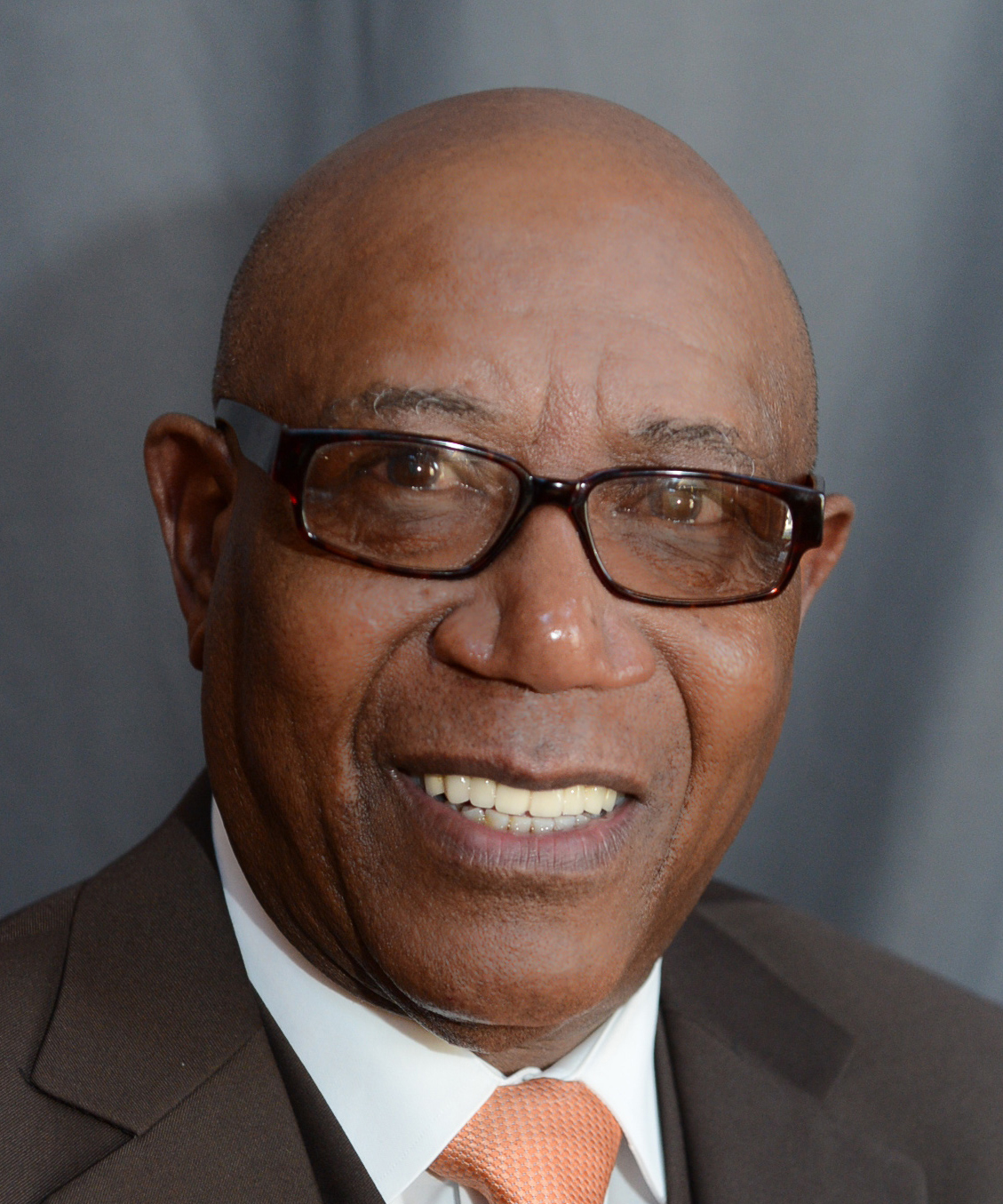

Member of the Georgia House of Representatives from the 165th district
- In office January 12, 2009 – August 14, 2021
- Preceded by: Al Williams
- Succeeded by: Edna Jackson

Personal details
- Born: April 4, 1944 Savannah, Georgia, US
- Died: August 14, 2021 (aged 77) Savannah, Georgia, US
- Party: Democratic

Edward V. "Mickey" Stephens (April 4, 1944 – August 14, 2021) was an American politician. He was a member of the Georgia House of Representatives from the 165th District, serving since 2008. He was a member of the Democratic Party, and also served in the House from 2002 to 2004.
