= List of Groove Phi Groove chapters =

Groove Phi Groove is a social fellowship. It was founded at Morgan State College (now Morgan State University) in Baltimore, Maryland as an alternative to mainstream historically black fraternities.

== College chapters ==
In the following list of Groove Phi Groove's collegiate chapters, active chapters are indicated in bold and inactive chapters are in italics.

Chapter	Charter date and range	Institution	Location	Status	Ref.
Mother Bear	October 12, 1962	Morgan State University	Baltimore, Maryland	Inactive	
49er		University of North Carolina at Charlotte	Charlotte, North Carolina	Inactive	
54th Regiment	2002	University of Massachusetts Amherst	Amherst, Massachusetts	Inactive	
Aggie		North Carolina A&T State University	Greensboro, North Carolina	Inactive	
Bear II		Livingstone College	Salisbury, North Carolina	Inactive	
Bear III		Lenoir–Rhyne University	Hickory, North Carolina	Inactive	
Big Apple		New York City Undergrad	Bronx, New York	Inactive	
Bison	19xx ?–1978; 1989	Howard University	Washington, D.C.	Inactive	
Bronco		Fayetteville State University	Fayetteville, North Carolina	Inactive	
Bruin		Shaw University	Raleigh, North Carolina	Inactive	
Buck		East Carolina University	Greenville, North Carolina	Inactive	
**Bulldog I**	1967	Bowie State University	Bowie, Maryland	Active	
Bulldog II		South Carolina State University	Orangeburg, South Carolina	Inactive	
Bulldog III		Wilberforce University	Wilberforce, Ohio	Inactive	
Bulldog IV		Knoxville College	Knoxville, Tennessee	Inactive	
Bulldog V		Louisiana Tech University	Ruston, Louisiana	Inactive	
Cougar		Kean University	Union, New Jersey	Inactive	
Cougar II		Chicago State University	Chicago, Illinois	Inactive	
Deacon		Bloomfield College	Bloomfield, New Jersey	Inactive	
Dragon		Drexel University	Philadelphia, Pennsylvania	Inactive	
Eagle I	19xx ?–May 1987	North Carolina Central University	Durham, North Carolina	Inactive	(Note: The university suspended the chapter for five years in 1987 for hazing.)
Eagle II		Coppin State University	Baltimore, Maryland	Inactive	
Engineers		Massachusetts Institute of Technology	Cambridge, Massachusetts	Inactive	
Falcon		St. Augustine's University	Raleigh, North Carolina	Inactive	
Firebird		University of the District of Columbia	Washington, D.C.	Inactive	
**Ghanaian Undergrads**		West Africa	Ghana	Active	
Golden Panther		Florida International University	Westchester, Florida	Inactive	
Great Dane		University at Albany, SUNY	Albany, New York	Inactive	
Griffin		Johnson & Wales University	Providence, Rhode Island	Inactive	
Hokie		Virginia Tech	Blacksburg, Virginia	Inactive	
**Hornet**		Delaware State University	Dover, Delaware	Active	
Huskie		Northeastern University	Boston, Massachusetts	Inactive	
Iron Hawk		University of Hartford	Hartford, Connecticut	Inactive	
Jaguar		Southern University	Baton Rouge, Louisiana	Inactive	
Marauder		Central State University	Wilberforce, Ohio	Inactive	
**Mighty Lion**		Lincoln University	Lincoln, Pennsylvania	Active	
Nittany Lion		Pennsylvania State University	University Park, Pennsylvania	Inactive	
Orangeman		Syracuse University	Syracuse, New York	Inactive	
Owl		Temple University	Philadelphia, Pennsylvania	Inactive	
Owl II		Southern Connecticut State University	New Haven, Connecticut	Inactive	
Panther III		Prairie View A&M University	Prairie View, Texas	Inactive	
Panther IV		Clark Atlanta University	Atlanta, Georgia	Inactive	
Panter VI		Adelphi University	Garden City, New York	Inactive	
Pioneer		William Paterson University	Wayne, New Jersey	Inactive	
Pirate		Hampton University	Hampton, Virginia	Inactive	
Prophet		Rowan University	Glassboro, New Jersey	Inactive	
Quaker	1973	University of Pennsylvania	Philadelphia, Pennsylvania	Inactive	
Raider		Rutgers University–Newark	Newark, New Jersey	Inactive	
Ram I		Winston-Salem State University	Winston-Salem, North Carolina	Inactive	
Red Hawk II		Miami University	Oxford, Ohio	Inactive	
Saber		Barber–Scotia College	Concord, North Carolina	Inactive	
Scarlet Knight		Rutgers University–New Brunswick	New Brunswick, New Jersey	Inactive	
Screaming Hawk		University of Maryland Eastern Shore	Princess Anne, Maryland	Inactive	
Seahawk		Wagner College	Staten Island, New York	Inactive	
Spartan		Norfolk State University	Norfolk, Virginia	Inactive	
Squire		Kean University	Union Township, New Jersey	Inactive	(Note: Chapter formed at Newark State College, now Kean University.)
Stallion		University of Pittsburgh	Pittsburgh, Pennsylvania	Inactive	
Tarheel		University of North Carolina at Chapel Hill	Chapel Hill, North Carolina	Inactive	
Tiger		Tuskegee University	Tuskegee, Alabama	Inactive	
Tiger II		Texas Southern University	Houston, Texas	Inactive	
Tiger III			Durham, North Carolina	Inactive	
Tiger IV		Benedict College	Columbia, South Carolina	Inactive	
**Tiger V**		Grambling State University	Grambling, Louisiana	Active	
Tiger VI		Morehouse College	Atlanta, Georgia	Inactive	
Tiger VII		Tennessee State University	Nashville, Tennessee	Inactive	
Tiger VIII		Towson University	Towson, Maryland	Inactive	
Trojan		Virginia State University	Petersburg, Virginia	Inactive	
Viking		Elizabeth City State University	Elizabeth City, North Carolina	Inactive	
Wolf	19xx ?–1983	Cheyney University	Cheyney, Pennsylvania	Inactive	(Note: The university suspended the chapter for violating unspecified campus regulations.)
Wolverine		Morris Brown College	Atlanta, Georgia	Inactive	
Yellowjacket		Allen University	Columbia, South Carolina	Inactive	
Yellowjacket II		West Virginia State University	Institute, West Virginia	Inactive	
		Johnson C. Smith University	Charlotte, North Carolina	Inactive	

== Graduate chapters ==
In the following list of Groove Phi Groove graduate chapters, active chapters are in bold and inactive chapters are in italics.

Chapter	Charter date and range	Location	Status	Ref.
Albany Graduate		Albany, New York	Inactive	
Atlanta Graduate		Atlanta, Georgia	Inactive	
**Augusta Graduate**		Augusta, Georgia	Active	
Austin Graduate		Austin, Texas	Inactive	
**Baltimore Columbia Graduate**		Columbia, Maryland	Active	
Birmingham Graduate		Birmingham, Alabama	Inactive	
Bridgeport Graduate		Bridgeport, Connecticut	Consolidated	(Note: Consolidated to form the Bridgeport and New Haven Graduate chapter.)
**Bridgeport and New Haven Graduate**		Bridgeport, Connecticut	Active	(Note: Formed from the consolidation of the Bridgeport and New Haven Graduate chapters.)
**Bridgeport and New Haven Graduate**		New Haven, Connecticut	Active	(Note: Formed from the consolidation of the Bridgeport and New Haven Graduate chapters.)
Central Jersey Graduate		Sewaren, New Jersey	Inactive	
Central Texas Graduate		Killeen, Texas	Inactive	
Charleston SC Graduate		Charleston, South Carolina	Inactive	
Charleston WV Graduate		Charleston, West Virginia	Inactive	
Charlotte Graduate		Charlotte, North Carolina	Inactive	
Cheyney University Virtual Alumni			Inactive	
**Chicago Graduate**		Chicago, Illinois	Active	
Coastal Tri-County Graduate		Myrtle Beach, South Carolina	Inactive	
Columbia Graduate		Columbia, South Carolina	Inactive	
Dallas/Fort Worth Graduate		Dallas, Texas	Inactive	
Dallas/Fort Worth Graduate		Fort Worth, Texas	Inactive	
Delaware State University Virtual Alumni			Inactive	
DELMARVA Graduate		Princess Anne, Maryland	Inactive	
**Detroit Graduate**		Detroit, Michigan	Active	
**District of Columbia Graduate**		Washington, D.C.	Active	
Down East Graduate		Rocky Mount, North Carolina	Inactive	
Durham Graduate		Durham, North Carolina	Inactive	
Elizabeth City Graduate		Elizabeth City, North Carolina	Inactive	
Fayetteville Graduate		Fayetteville, North Carolina	Inactive	
Greater Miami Graduate		Miami, Florida	Inactive	
Greensboro Aggie Graduate	197x ?–1985	Greensboro, North Carolina	Inactive	(Note: Became the Piedmont Triad Graduate Chapter.)
**Greensboro Graduate**	April 21, 1990	Greensboro, North Carolina	Active	(Note: Split off from the Piedmont Triad Graduate Chapter.)
Greenville/Spartanburg Graduate		Greenville, South Carolina	Inactive	
**Hampton Roads Graduate**		Hampton, Virginia	Active	
Harrisburg Graduate		Harrisburg, Pennsylvania	Inactive	
Hartford Graduate		Hartford, Connecticut	Inactive	
**Houston Graduate**		Houston, Texas	Active	
Johnson C. Smith Virtual Alumni			Inactive	
Lincoln University Virtual Alumni			Inactive	
Long Island Graduate		Long Island, New York	Inactive	
**Los Angeles Graduate**	2000	Los Angeles, California	Active	
MidSouth Graduate		Memphis, Tennessee	Inactive	
New Haven Graduate (see **Bridgeport and New Haven Graduate)**		New Haven, Connecticut	Consolidated	
**New Jersey Graduate**		Newark, New Jersey	Active	
New York Graduate		New York City, New York	Inactive	
North Carolina Central University Virtual Alumni			Inactive	
Northern Maryland Graduate		Baltimore, Maryland	Inactive	
**Northern Virginia Graduate**		Arlington, Virginia	Active	
Orangeburg Graduate		Orangeburg, South Carolina	Inactive	
**Philadelphia Graduate**		Philadelphia, Pennsylvania	Active	
Piedmont Triad Graduate	1987	Durham North Carolina	Inactive	(Note: Formed from the Greensboro Aggie Graduate Chapter.)
Piedmont Triad Graduate	1987	Greensboro, North Carolina	Inactive	(Note: Formed from the Greensboro Aggie Graduate Chapter.)
Piedmont Triad Graduate	1987	High Point, North Carolina	Inactive	(Note: Formed from the Greensboro Aggie Graduate Chapter.)
Piedmont Triad Graduate	1987	Raleigh, North Carolina	Inactive	(Note: Formed from the Greensboro Aggie Graduate Chapter.)
Piedmont Triad Graduate	1987	Winston-Salem, North Carolina	Inactive	(Note: Formed from the Greensboro Aggie Graduate Chapter.)
**Pittsburgh Graduate**		Pittsburgh, Pennsylvania	Active	
Prince George´s County Graduate		Prince George's County, Maryland	Inactive	
**Quaker Alumni**		Philadelphia, Pennsylvania	Active	
**Raleigh Graduate**		Raleigh, North Carolina	Active	
Richmond Graduate		Richmond, Virginia	Inactive	
South Carolina Low Country Graduate		Pawleys Island, South Carolina	Inactive	
**South Georgia Graduate**	July 26, 2014	Atlanta, Georgia	Active	
Southern New Jersey Graduate		Mount Laurel, New Jersey	Inactive	
**Stone Mountain Graduate**		Norcross, Georgia	Active	
Tri-County Graduate (First)	April 23, 1994	Edgecombe County, Nash County, and Wilson County, North Carolina	Inactive	
**Tri-County Graduate**		Horsham, Pennsylvania	Active	
Triangle NC Graduate		Durham, North Carolina	Inactive	
University of Pennsylvania Virtual Alumni			Inactive	
Washington, D.C. Graduate		Washington, D.C.	Inactive	
**Westchester Graduate**		Westchester, New York	Active	
**Wilmington Graduate**	September 3, 1983	Wilmington, Delaware	Active	
Winston-Salem Graduate		Winston-Salem, North Carolina	Inactive	
