= 2015 Savannah mayoral election =

Savannah mayoral election, 2015
- November 3, 2015 (first round); December 1, 2015 (runoff)
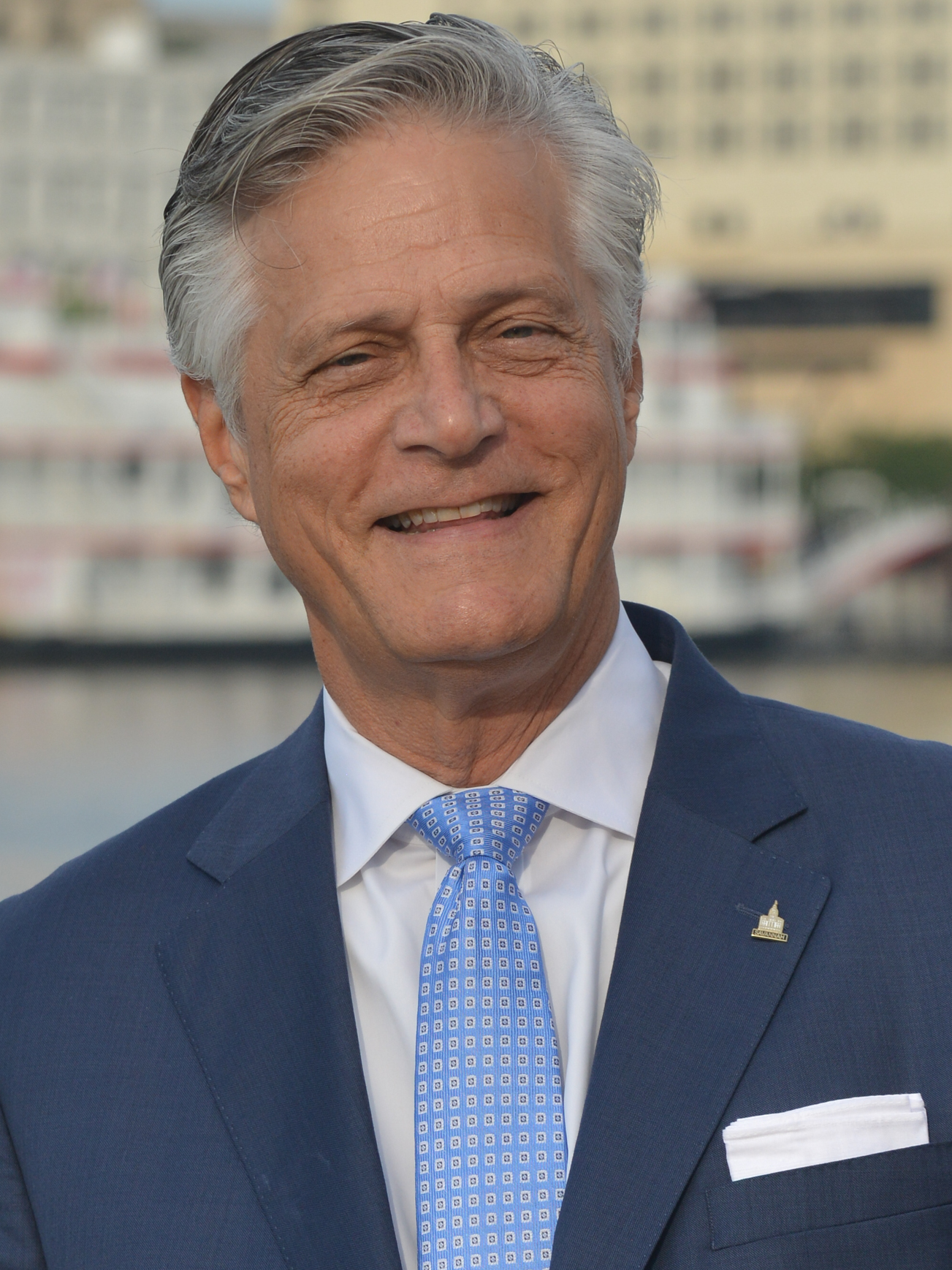

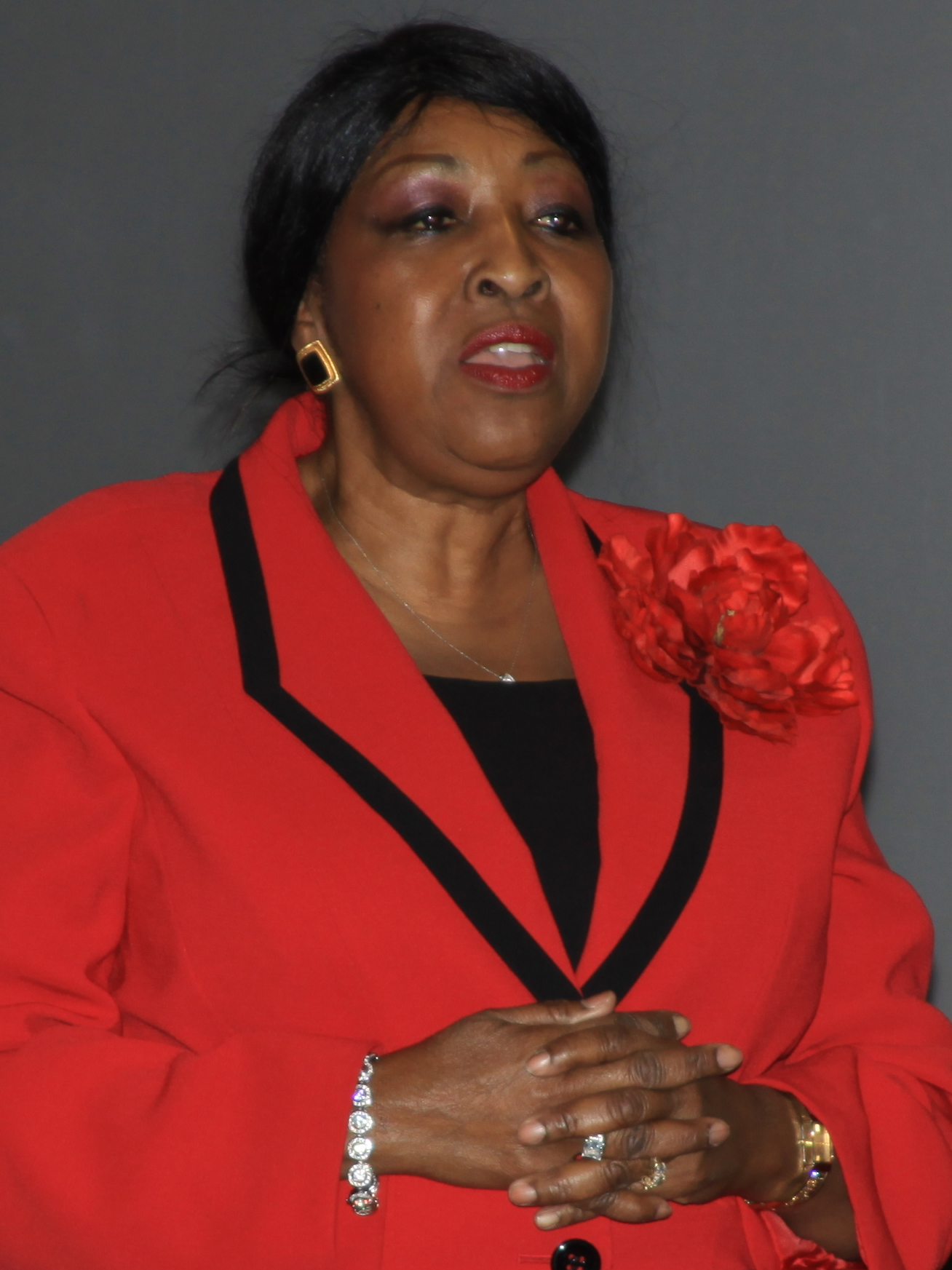

Candidate	Eddie DeLoach	Edna B. Jackson	Murray Silver
First-round vote	9,332	9,802	2,681
First-round percentage	41.89%	44.00%	12.04%
Second-round vote	12,472	11,049
Second-round percentage	53.02%	46.98%
Mayor before election
Edna Jackson
Democratic
Elected mayor
Eddie DeLoach
Republican

The 2015 Savannah mayoral election took place on November 5 and December 1, 2015. It saw the election of Eddie DeLoach, who unseated incumbent mayor Edna Jackson.

This was the first time in over 20 years that an incumbent mayor of Savannah lost reelection. Eddie DeLoach became the first person elected mayor of Savannah to identify as a Republican since Susan Weiner was in 1991.

== First round ==
First round results
Party	Candidate	Votes	%
Nonpartisan	Edna B. Jackson (incumbent)	9,802	44.00
Nonpartisan	Eddie DeLoach	9,332	41.89
Nonpartisan	Murray Silver	2,681	12.04
Nonpartisan	Louis E. Wilson Sr.	442	1.98
Write-in	Write-in	18	0.08
Total votes		22,275	

== Runoff ==
Runoff results
Party	Candidate	Votes	%
Nonpartisan	Eddie DeLoach	12,472	53.02
Nonpartisan	Edna B. Jackson (incumbent)	11,049	46.98
Total votes		23,521	
