= MiQuan Green =

American politician

Member-elect of the Georgia House of Representatives from the 165th district
- Assuming office January 2027
- Succeeding: Edna Jackson

Personal details
- Party: Democratic

MiQuan A. Green is an American politician. A member of the Democratic Party, he is the member-elect for the 165th district of the Georgia House of Representatives.
