= 2019 Savannah mayoral election =

Savannah mayoral election, 2019
- November 5, 2019 (first round); December 3, 2019 (runoff)
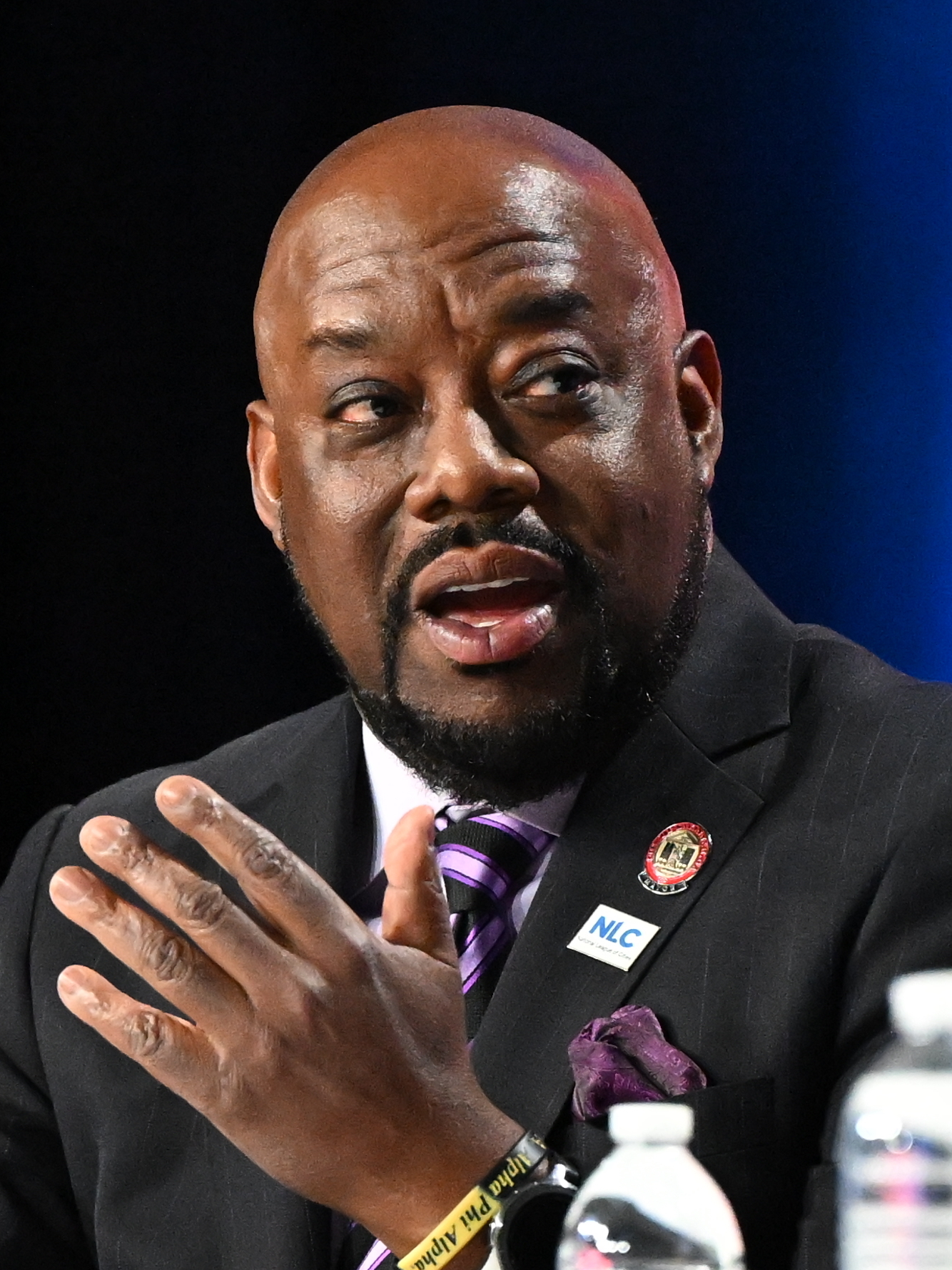

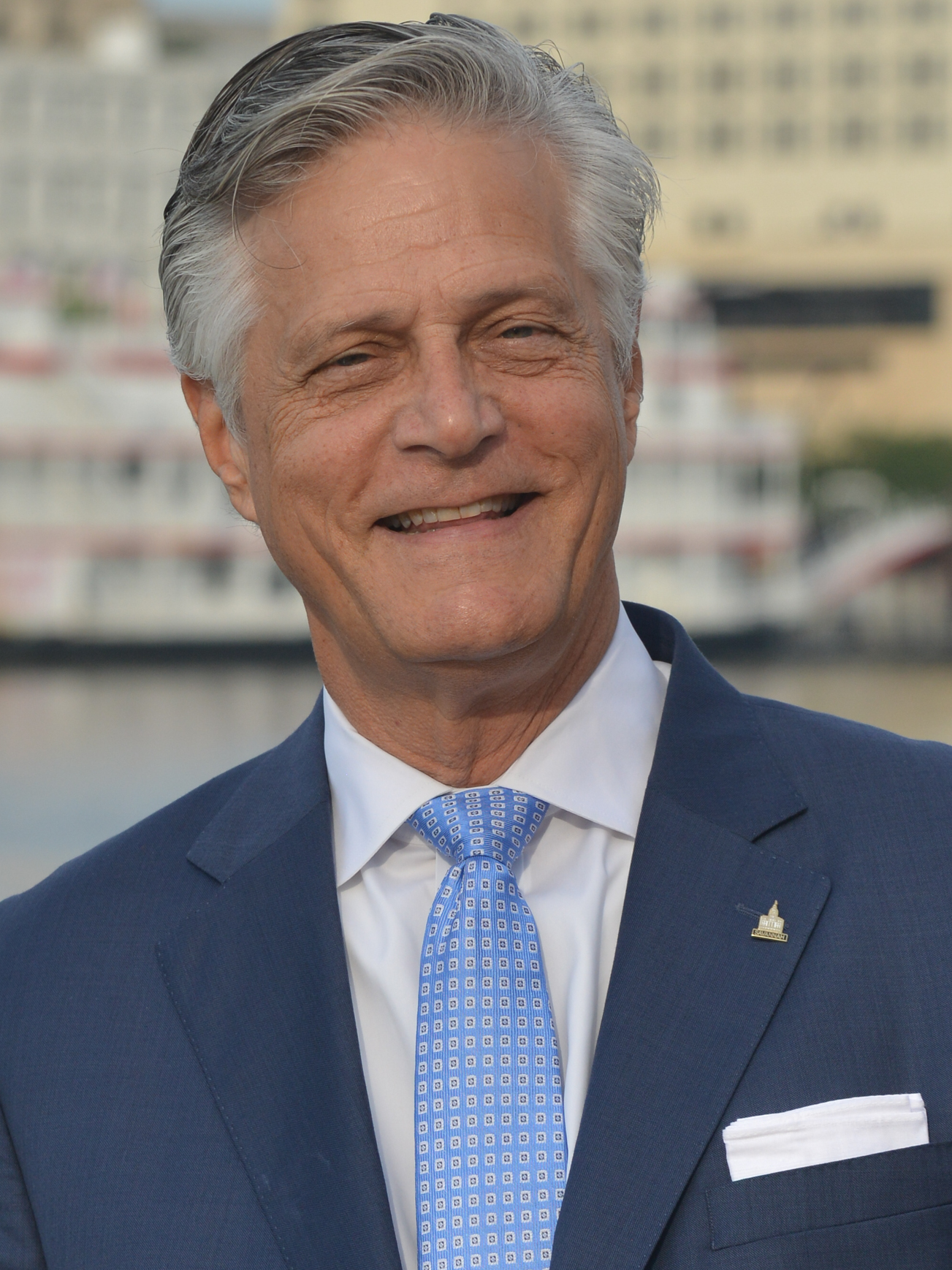

Candidate	Van R. Johnson	Eddie DeLoach	Regina D. Thomas
First-round vote	11,394	9,810	3,347
First-round percentage	45.95%	39.56%	13.50%
Second-round vote	14,884	9,291
Second-round percentage	61.57%	38.43%
Mayor before election
Eddie DeLoach
Republican
Elected mayor
Van R. Johnson
Democratic

The 2019 Savannah mayoral election held an initial round on November 5, 2019, with a runoff held on December 3, 2019. Incumbent mayor Eddie DeLoach was defeated by longtime alderman Van R. Johnson.

== First round ==
First round results
Party	Candidate	Votes	%
Nonpartisan	Van R. Johnson	11,394	45.95
Nonpartisan	Eddie DeLoach (incumbent)	9,810	39.56
Nonpartisan	Regina D. Thomas	3,347	13.50
Nonpartisan	Louis E. Wilson Sr.	209	0.84
Nonpartisan	Write-in	36	0.15
Total votes		21,796	100.00

== Runoff ==
Second round results
Party	Candidate	Votes	%
Nonpartisan	Van R. Johnson	14,884	61.57%
Nonpartisan	Eddie DeLoach (incumbent)	9,291	38.43%
Total votes		24,175	100%
