= Chet Grimsley =

American football player (born 1956)

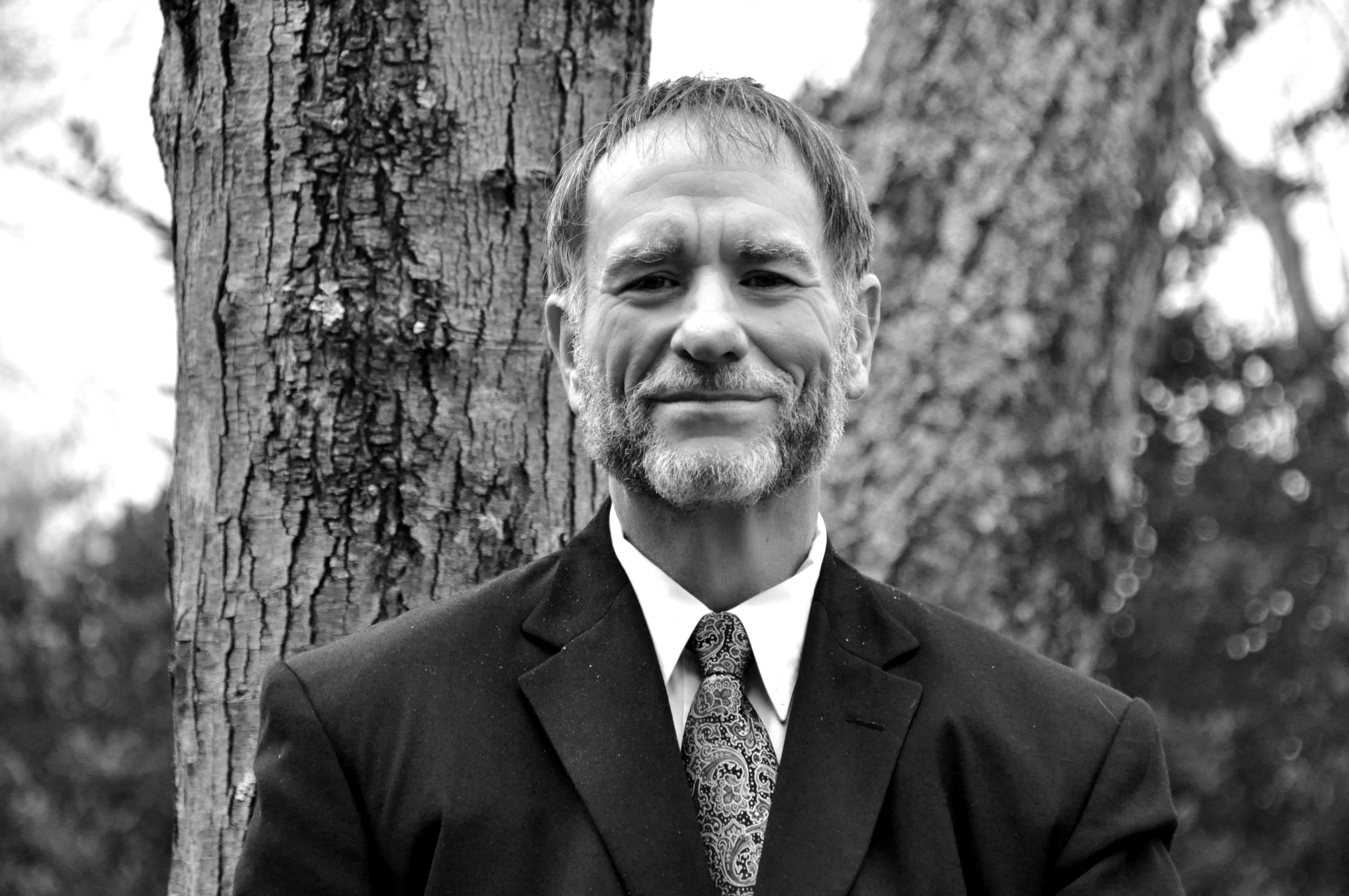
Chet Grimsley, The White Golden Bull (2010)

Chet L. Grimsley (born July 14, 1956) is an American football player. Grimsley was the first White-American student athlete from the Central Intercollegiate Athletic Association (CIAA). He joined the Groove Phi Groove Social Fellowship at Johnson C. Smith University, a historically black university (HBCU). In 1976, Grimsley received the M.V.P. Award and the Pettis Norman Award for football. Grimsley was also named to the First Team all-CIAA and received Eastern Airlines most valuable player all american. Grimsley was also the president of the Fellowship of Christian Athletes and Athlete of the Month at an HBCU.

== Biography ==
=== Early life ===
Chet Grimsley was born on July 14, 1956 in Crawford Long Hospital in Atlanta, Georgia. His father Chester Ramon Grimsley was an All-State football player for State Champion Tift County High School and at 6 ft 8 inches and 270 lbs, went on to play for the University of Alabama on a football scholarship. The younger Grimsley was 6 ft 5.5 inches and 275 lbs, and recruited to Johnson C. Smith University (JCSU) by Coach Charlie Cox. He was not uncomfortable attending a HBCU because he had grown up in Southwest Atlanta, Georgia, where he was the only white student athlete on the Therrell High School Football Team in 1973 in a predominantly Black high school. He also participated in baseball and soccer.

=== University ===
Upon arrival at JCSU in 1974, Grimsley was greeted and assisted by Grooves. As a sophomore, he was inspired to pledge Groove Phi Groove, a social fellowship that is common at HBCUs around the United States. Grimsley not only excelled in football, but was a consistent fixture on the Dean's List and popular on campus. Grimsley was named to the first team CIAA and MVP award for the Golden Bulls of JCSU.

=== Sports career ===
In 1976, Grimsley won several accolades, including Eastern Airlines Player of the Year, 1976 All-American, 1976 Mr. Football, All CIAA 1st Team. As a senior in 1977, Grimsley was Athlete of the Month, but decided not to pursue a professional career as a football player due to his goals and size. After graduating from JCSU, Grimsley was an assistant coach for the university in 1978 after graduation, and then again in 1999-2000.

Grimsley went on to make the practice squad of the Tampa Bay Buccaneers in August 1979. He joined the United States Army in December 1979 and became the first football player to graduate from the U.S. Military Intelligence School. He was also an All-Army wrestling champion. Grimsley served in the Army and Army Reserves until 1986. Additionally, Grimsley was a bodyguard who worked with Diana Ross, Jim & Tammy Faye Bakker and Gary Coleman. Grimsley then took a more traditional career approach by becoming a manager for Marshall’s and subsequently, Supervisor Retail Distribution for the same organization.

In 1995, Grimsley was inducted in the Johnson C. Smith University Sports Hall of Fame along with Canadian Football League Hall of Fame Grover Covington. He was recognized as the first Euro-American to garner accolades as All-CIAA and All-American at JCSU and at HBCU.

=== After retirement ===
Grimsley now volunteers at Shriners Hospitals for Children. He lives in Blairsville, Georgia.

== In media ==
Grimsley's autobiography, "The White Golden Bull," was published by Xulon Press. ISBN 9781607912552 His second book published by Too Smart Publishing was "The White Golden Bull: How Faith in God Transcended Racial Barriers", ISBN 9780979692857. The book chronicles his experience growing up in Atlanta, Georgia and his journey to play football for JCSU.

Windstream Communications produced two 30 minute shows called "Common Cup" based on Grimsley's life and the book "The White Golden Bull".
