= Therrell High School =

Public high school in Atlanta, Georgia, United States

Daniel McLaughlin Therrell High School

Location
- 3099 Panther Trail Southwest; Atlanta, Georgia 30311; United States; 33°41′57″N 84°29′23″W

Information
- Type: Public
- Motto: You can't hide that Panther Pride
- Established: 1960
- School district: Atlanta Public Schools
- NCES School ID: 130012004215
- Principal: Dante Edwards
- Staff: 64.40 (FTE)
- Grades: 9–12
- Enrollment: 1,005 (2023-2024)
- Student to teacher ratio: 15.61
- Colors: Black and red
- Mascot: Panthers
- Nickname: Therrell, The Panthers, Panther Crew, The Trail
- Yearbook: Visions
- Website: atlantapublicschools.us/therrell

Daniel McLaughlin Therrell High School is a public high school located near Interstate 285 and Greenbriar Mall in southwest Atlanta, Georgia, United States.

Three schools operate at the Therrell campus:

- D. M. Therrell School of Health Science and Research
- D. M. Therrell School of Law, Government and Public Policy
- School for Technology, Engineering, Math and Science at Therrell (STEMS)

== Alma mater ==
The school's alma mater, performed only at graduation and during anniversary celebrations, was composed in the early days of Therrell High School.

== Athletics ==
The Therrell High School Panthers compete in region 6-AA classification. The Therrell Lady Panthers track and field team captured its first AAA state championship since 1989 in 2007. The Therrell High School Panthers Boys' Basketball Team won the 2019 State AA GHSA Basketball Championships.

== Notable alumni ==
- Chet Grimsley, retired football player and author
- Winford Hood, retired NFL player
- Mac McWhorter, football offensive line coach
- New Jack, professional wrestler
- Polow Da Don, rapper and producer
- Herman 'Skip' Mason, historian, archivist, and former President of Alpha Phi Alpha fraternity
- Kelvin Pritchett, retired NFL player
- Tim Roberts, retired NFL player
- Sleepy Brown, R&B singer and producer
- Sedale Threatt, retired NBA player
- Rick Waits, MLB pitcher
- Lynn Westmoreland, former member of the U.S. House Of Representatives
- Young Dro, rapper
- Anthony Edwards, NBA player
- Verda Colvin, Georgia Supreme Court Justice

Therrell High School has an active alumni association—D.M. Therrell High School Alumni Association, Inc., established in April 2010. The D.M. Therrell High School Alumni Scholarship Fund was also established in April 2010. The alumni's annual weekend is the main fundraiser of the organization, with the first being held October 15–17, 2010.
