= Eddie DeLoach =

American businessman and politician

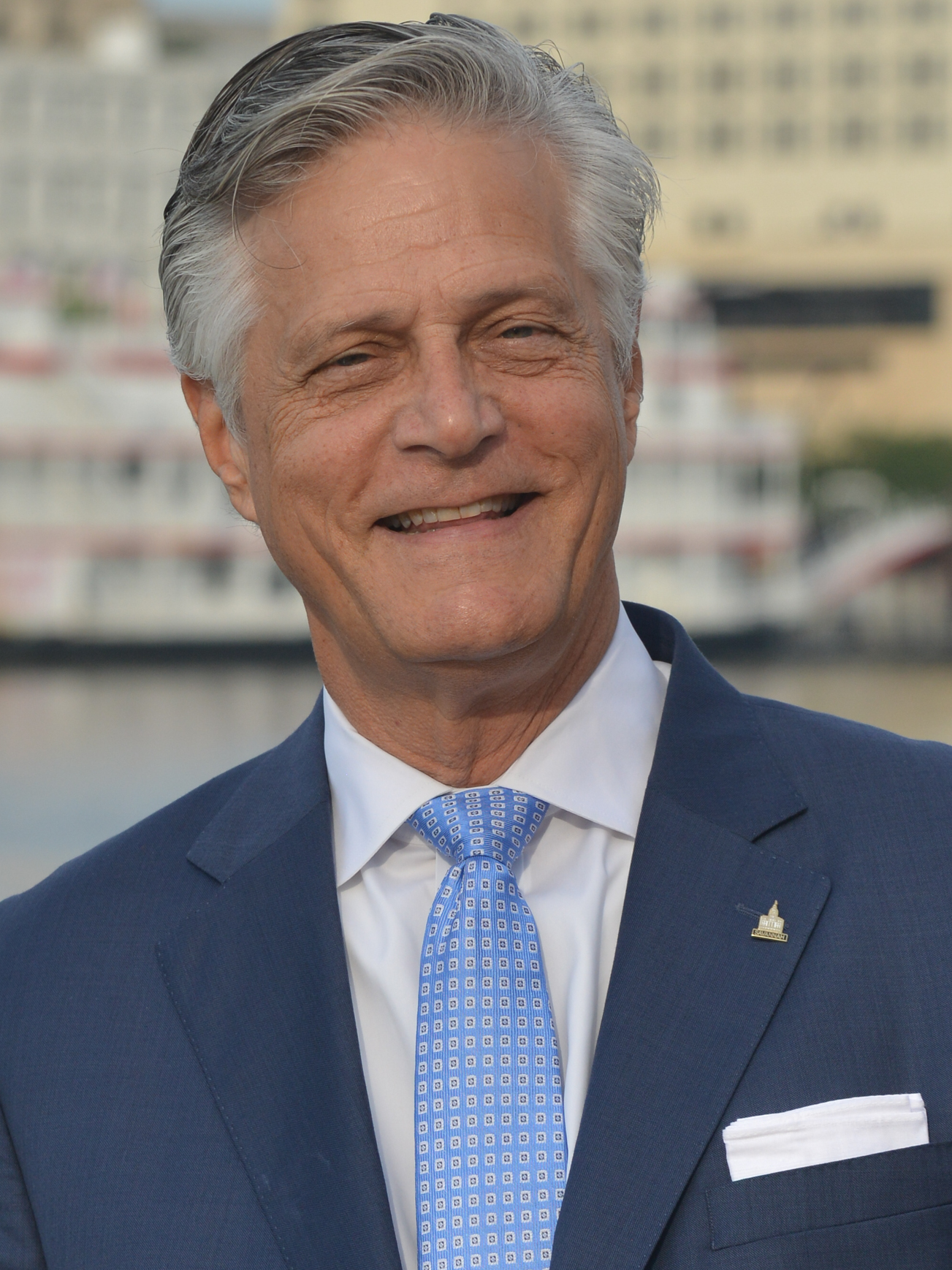

66th Mayor of Savannah, Georgia
- In office January 1, 2016 – January 1, 2020
- Preceded by: Edna Jackson
- Succeeded by: Van R. Johnson

Personal details
- Born: Eddie W. DeLoach
- Party: Republican
- Education: Berry College,(BA)

Eddie W. DeLoach is an American businessman and politician who served as the 66th mayor of Savannah, Georgia. Prior to running for mayor in the 2015 election, DeLoach served as a commissioner for Chatham County's 7th District from 1992 to 2000. He earned a bachelor's degree in history and political science from Berry College. DeLoach is a member of the Republican Party.

== Personal life ==
Eddie DeLoach is the son of Jimmy DeLoach, a former three-term mayor of Garden City, Georgia. He and his wife, Cynthia, have two children and four grandchildren.

== Career ==
Eddie DeLoach is the president and co-owner of a Savannah-area landscaping business that he and his brother founded in 1984. He served as a commissioner from Chatham County's 7th District from 1992 to 2000, and ran unsuccessfully for chairman of the Chatham County Board of Commissioners in 2012. When he won the election for mayor of Savannah in 2015, he became the first conservative mayor of the city in more than 20 years. The following year, he was voted "Best Conservative" by Connect Savannah.

In his bid for a second term, DeLoach was defeated in the 2019 Savannah mayoral election by longtime alderman Van R. Johnson.
