= Georgia's 165th House of Representatives district =

State district in Georgia, USA

Georgia's 165th State House of Representatives district
Representative
Edna Jackson; D–Savannah
- Demographics: 37.2% White; 55.4% Black; 3.3% Hispanic; 1.7% Asian
- Population: 56,439

District 165 elects one member of the Georgia House of Representatives. It contains parts of Chatham County.

== Members ==
- Al Williams (2005–2013)
- Mickey Stephens (2009–2021)
- Edna Jackson (since 2021)
