= Georgia's 168th House of Representatives district =

State district in Georgia, USA

Georgia's 168th State House of Representatives district
Representative
| Al Williams; D–Midway |
- Demographics: 40.1% White; 43.9% Black; 9.6% Hispanic; 2.4% Asian
- Population: 53,798

District 168 elects one member of the Georgia House of Representatives. It contains parts of Liberty County.

== Members ==
- Al Williams (since 2013)
