= Kelvin Pritchett =

American football player (born 1969)

No. 94, 93
- Position: Defensive tackle

Personal information
- Born: October 24, 1969 (age 57); Atlanta, Georgia, U.S.
- Listed height: 6 ft 3 in (1.91 m)
- Listed weight: 330 lb (150 kg)

Career information
- High school: Therrell (Atlanta)
- College: Ole Miss
- NFL draft: 1991: 1st round, 20th overall pick

Career history
- Detroit Lions (1991–1994); Jacksonville Jaguars (1995–1998); Detroit Lions (1999–2004)

Awards and highlights
- Third-team All-American (1990); First-team All-SEC (1990); Second-team All-SEC (1989); Ole Miss Team of the Century (1893-1992)

Career NFL statistics
- Tackles: 476
- Sacks: 31.5
- Passes defended: 5
- Interceptions: 1
- Forced fumbles: 1
- Fumble recoveries: 5
- Stats at Pro Football Reference

Kelvin Bratodd Pritchett (born October 24, 1969) is an American former professional football player who was a defensive tackle in the National Football League (NFL) for the Detroit Lions and Jacksonville Jaguars. He played college football for the Ole Miss Rebels. He was selected in the first round selection of the 1991 NFL draft.

== Early life ==
Pritchett attended Therrell High School. As a senior, he recorded 100 tackles and 18 sacks. He received All-state and Atlanta Journal-Constitution All-city honors.

He accepted a football scholarship from the University of Mississippi. In 1988, he became a starter after the fifth game of the season, registering 84 total tackles (second on the team), 56 solo tackles and 3 sacks. The next year, he made 78 total tackles (fourth on the team), 64 solo tackles, 7 sacks (led the team), 2 passes deflected, 2 forced fumbles and 2 fumble recoveries.

As a senior, he received third-team All-American honors, after starting at right defensive end, while finishing with 91 tackles (fourth on the team), 22 tackles for loss (led the team), 8 sacks (second on the team), 3 forced fumbles and 3 passes deflected.

In 1993, he was voted to the school's "Team of the Century" (1893–1993). In 2008, he was inducted into the Ole Miss Athletics Hall of Fame.

== Professional career ==
=== Detroit Lions (first stint) ===
Pritchett was selected by the Dallas Cowboys in the first round (20th overall) of the 1991 NFL draft, who traded him immediately to the Detroit Lions in exchange for a second round (#37-Dixon Edwards), third round (#64-James Richards) and fourth round (#108-Tony Hill) selections. As a rookie, he was a backup on a team that went 12-4 and advanced to the NFC championship game. He collected 20 tackles and 1.5 sacks.

In 1992, he started 15 out of 16 games at right defensive end in his second year and registered 38 tackles, 6.5 sacks (second on the team and career-high) and one forced fumble. He had 3 tackles and 2 sacks against the Cincinnati Bengals.

In 1993, he only started the last five regular season games at right defensive end in the team's 3-4 defense, recording 42 tackles (33 solo) and 4 sacks. He had 2 sacks against the Phoenix Cardinals.

In 1994, he missed most of preseason in a contract holdout and did not start the season opener against the Atlanta Falcons. He started 15 out of 16 games, finishing second on the team with 5.5 sacks and a career-high 73 tackles. He had 3 sacks in the twelfth game against the Buffalo Bills. In 1995, he was moved back to right defensive end switching sides with Robert Porcher, recording 73 tackles (sixth on the team) and 5.5 sacks (second on the team).

=== Jacksonville Jaguars ===
On March 11, 1995, he was signed by the Jacksonville Jaguars as a free agent to a four-year $8.6 million contract before the start of the franchise's first season, with the intention of playing him at left defensive tackle. He finished with 101 tackles (third on the team) and 1.5 sacks.

In 1996, he missed three games with a pulled groin, ending a string of 82 consecutive games. He started 4 out of 13 games, backing up most of season John Jurkovic and Don Davey, although he saw extensive action in most games. He posted 39 tackles, 2 sacks, 7 quarterback pressures and 2 fumbles recoveries. He had 7 tackles, one sack and one quarterback pressure against the New England Patriots.

In 1997, he started five games in place of Jurkovic, who was lost for the year with a broken leg suffered in the fourth game. He set a team record with 3 sacks in a single-game against the Cincinnati Bengals. Pritchett tore the anterior cruciate ligament in his right knee during a one-on-one drill on November 4, finishing the season on the injured reserve list. He registered 44 tackles (2 for loss), 3 sacks, 9 quarterback pressures and one fumble recovery

In 1998, he started 9 out of 15 games, after being limited with an hyperextended elbow and a sprained ankle. He collected 37 tackles (4 for loss), 3 sacks and 15 quarterback pressures.

=== Detroit Lions (second stint) ===
On April 23, 1999, he was signed as a free agent by the Detroit Lions. He became a key backup, registering 26 tackles (20 solo).

In 2004, although he was a third-string defensive tackle, he was also a part of the kickoff wedge team (Jared DeVries, Tyrone Hopson and Cory Schlesinger) that received a special teams recognition from USA Today's "All-Joe Team".

== Personal life ==
In 2004, he intended to vote by absentee ballot until a friend forgot to pick it up for him, so he had to fly to Jacksonville (his previous residence address) to cast his ballot and return to Detroit on the same day.

Pritchett appeared twice (1994, 1995) as a guest on Home Improvement. He is married and has two children with his wife and an older daughter from a previous relationship.
