= Kamal Johnson =

American football player (born 1991)

No. 73, 93
- Position: Defensive end

Personal information
- Born: December 9, 1991 (age 34); Newark, New Jersey, U.S.
- Listed height: 6 ft 3 in (1.91 m)
- Listed weight: 314 lb (142 kg)

Career information
- High school: Willingboro (NJ)
- College: Temple
- NFL draft: 2014: undrafted

Career history
- Miami Dolphins (2014); Washington Redskins (2015–(2016)*; San Diego Chargers (2016)*; Baltimore Brigade (2017)*
- * Offseason or practice squad member only
- Stats at Pro Football Reference
- Stats at ArenaFan.com

Kamal Johnson (born December 9, 1991) is an American former football defensive tackle. He played college football at Temple. He is also a member of Groove Phi Groove SFI. He signed as an undrafted free agent with the Miami Dolphins in 2014.

== Professional career ==
=== Miami Dolphins ===
After going unselected in the 2014 NFL draft, Johnson signed with the Miami Dolphins on May 12, 2014. On August 30, 2014, he was placed on injured reserve.

Johnson was waived on June 10, 2017.

=== Washington Redskins ===
Johnson signed with the practice squad of the Washington Redskins on January 1, 2016. On January 14, 2016, Johnson signed a futures contract with the Washington Redskins. He was released on May 2.

=== San Diego Chargers ===
Johnson was signed by the San Diego Chargers. On September 3, 2019, he was released by the Chargers.
