= Van R. Johnson =

American politician (born 1968)

Van Johnson
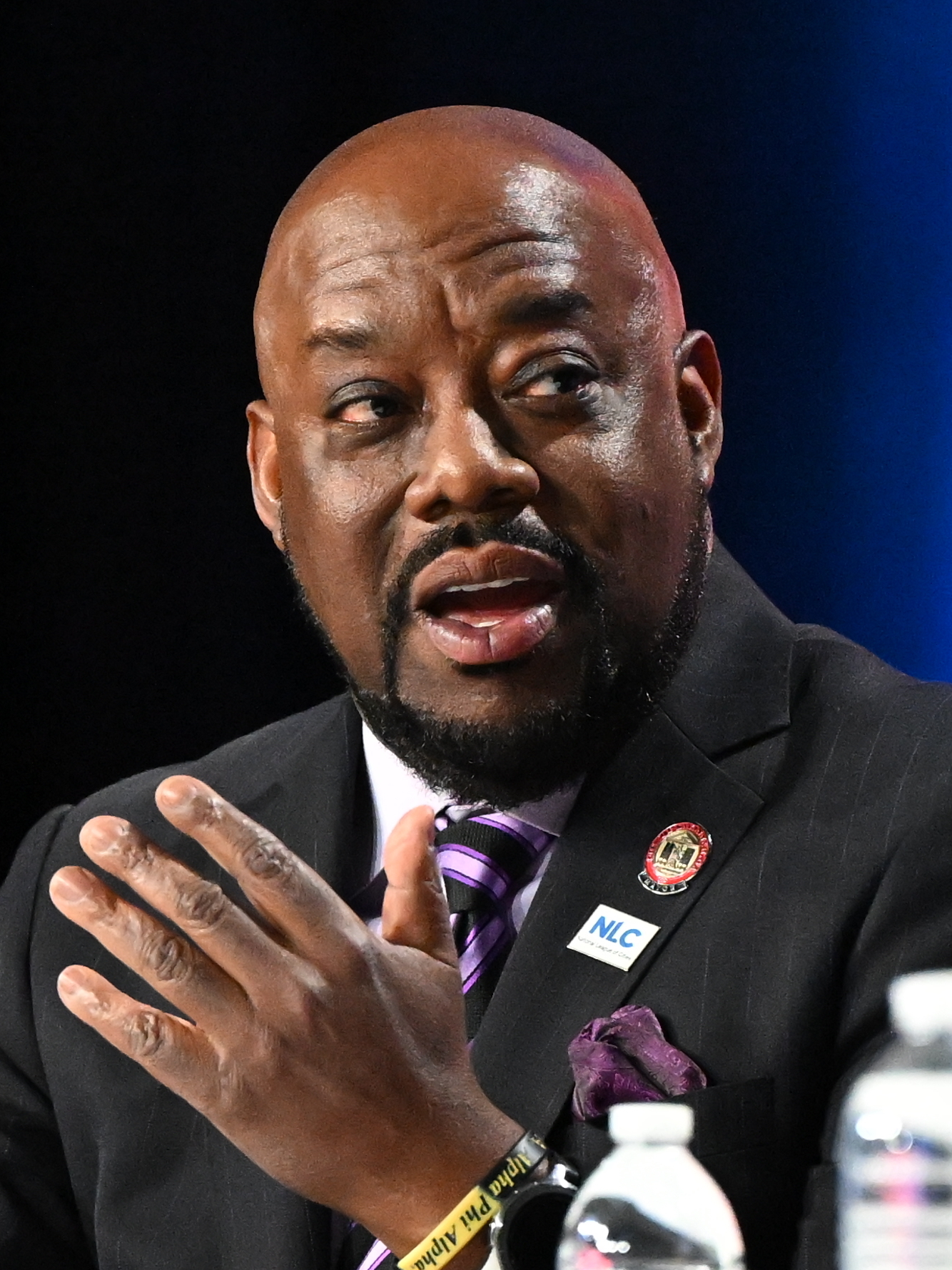
- Johnson in 2025

67th Mayor of Savannah
- Incumbent
- Assumed office January 1, 2020
- Preceded by: Eddie DeLoach

Personal details
- Born: 1968 (age 57–58) New York City, New York, U.S.
- Party: Democratic
- Education: Savannah State University (BS); Georgia Southern University (MPA)
- Website: Office website Campaign website

Van R. Johnson II (born 1968) is an American politician who has served as the mayor of Savannah, Georgia, since 2020. He is the fourth African-American mayor in the city's history. Before becoming Mayor, he served four terms as Alderman for the Savannah City Council's 1st District.

== Early life and education ==
Johnson was born and raised in Brownsville and Crown Heights, in the New York City borough of Brooklyn. He is the oldest child of the late Van R. Johnson, an Army veteran, law enforcement officer and general construction contractor, and Cynthia E. Johnson, a licensed certified social worker and licensed practical nurse.

Johnson attended New York City Public Schools and graduated from Erasmus Hall High School at age 16 and enrolled in Savannah State University, the oldest public historically Black college and university in the state of Georgia. He earned a bachelor's degree in business administration in 1990 and a master's degree in public administration from Georgia Southern University.

Johnson is a life member of the Alpha Phi Alpha fraternity, having been initiated into its Beta Phi Lambda chapter in 1991.

== Career ==
After college, Johnson worked as a Chatham County Police Officer, Chatham County Sheriff's Reserve Deputy and, later, assistant director of human resources for Savannah's Chatham County.

As a political newcomer, Johnson defeated Alderman David Jones, a 12-year incumbent for Savannah's 1st District seat.

From 2004 to 2019, Johnson served as Alderman for the Savannah City Council's 1st District, additionally serving as Mayor Pro Tem and Vice Chair during his tenure. He unseated incumbent Eddie DeLoach in the 2019 Savannah mayoral election and was sworn in as Mayor on January 1, 2020. In November 2020, Mayor Johnson was elected among 16 Biden-Harris electors from Georgia for the Electoral College in the 2020 Presidential Election. On November 7, 2023, he was re-elected Mayor of Savannah with 77% of the vote against Kesha Gibson-Carter and T.L. Davis.
