= Edna Jackson (politician) =

American politician (born 1944)

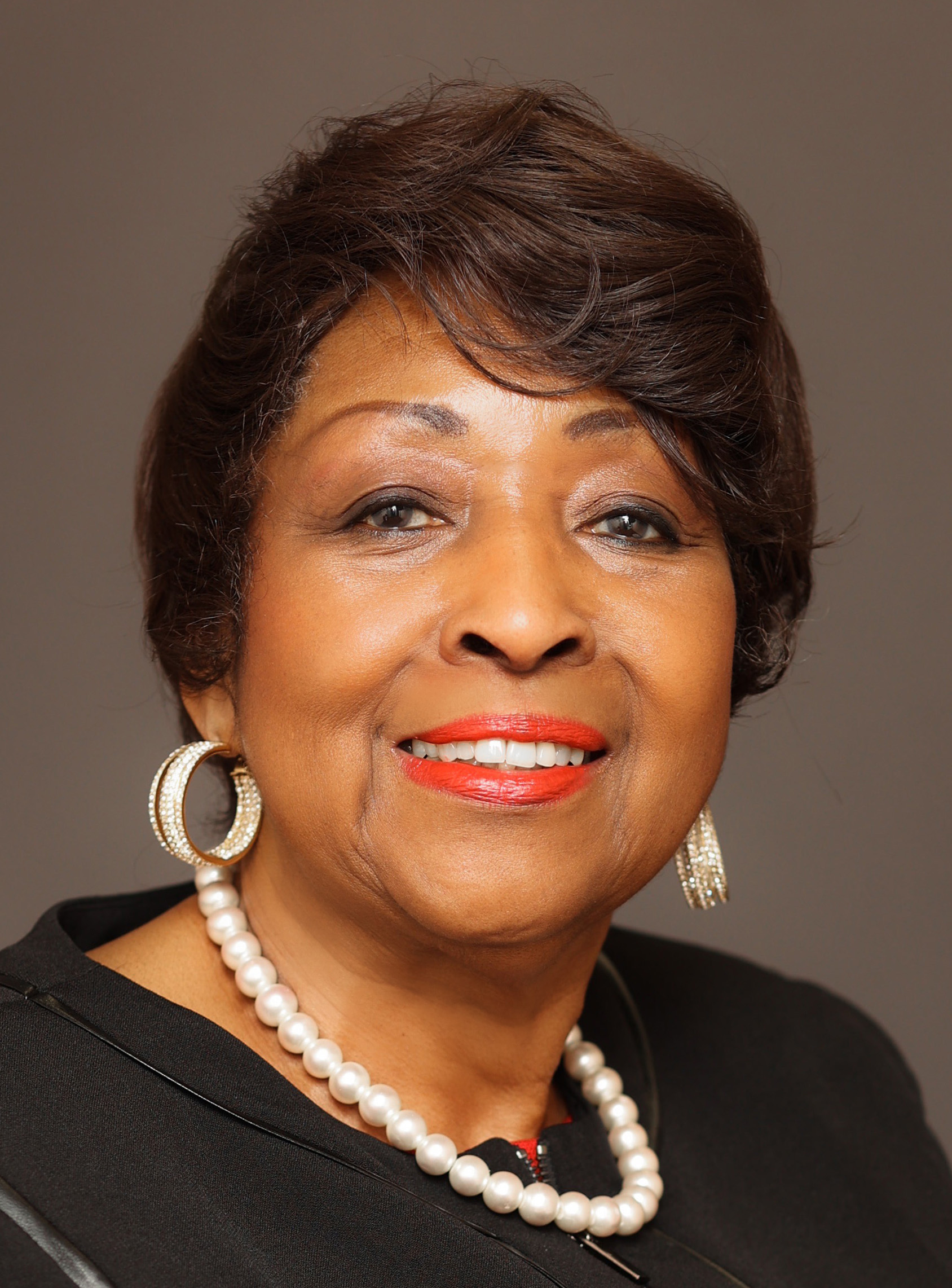

Member of the Georgia House of Representatives from the 165th district
- Incumbent
- Assumed office November 10, 2021
- Preceded by: Mickey Stephens
- Succeeded by: MiQuan Green (elect)

65th Mayor of Savannah
- In office January 1, 2012 – January 1, 2016
- Preceded by: Otis Johnson
- Succeeded by: Eddie DeLoach

Personal details
- Born: Edna Branch Jackson; September 18, 1944 (age 82) Savannah, Georgia, U.S.
- Party: Democratic

Edna Branch Jackson (born September 18, 1944) is an American politician from Georgia. Jackson is a Democratic member of the Georgia House of Representatives for District 165. She was previously the Mayor of Savannah from 2012 to 2015, the first female African-American to hold the office.

== Early life and education ==
Edna Jackson was born in Savannah, Georgia, to parents Georgia Branch Dillard and Henry Reid. In an interview by Stephen Moody of WJCL, Jackson is quoted as beginning her community service involvement at nine years old, after meeting Wesley Wallace Law. She joined the NAACP Youth Council, with whom she participated in non-violent protests for racial equity across North Carolina, Georgia and Florida.

She graduated from Alfred E. Beach High School in 1962. Jackson continued her involvement with the NAACP Youth Council during her college education. Jackson graduated from Savannah State University, with a B.S. in Sociology in 1968, and a M.Ed. in Political Science Education in 1972.

== Career ==
Beginning her career as a social worker, Jackson joined the Economic Opportunity Authority for Savannah-Chatham County Area, Inc.

From 1971 through 2001, Edna Jackson worked for her alma mater, Savannah State University. In 1971, the president of Savannah State University, Prince Jackson, Jr., hired Edna Jackson as the director of the university’s emergency school assistant program. Edna Jackson went on to work as the director of alumni affairs and coordinator of the Elderhostel Program. She retired from her role at SSU in 2001.

Jackson's career continued in the city government of Savannah. As described in her biography by The HistoryMakers, Jackson "served as alderman at large on the City Council of Savannah for three terms, and mayor pro tempore of Savannah for two terms. In 2012, Jackson became the first African American woman to be elected as mayor of Savannah, serving for one term."

Following a special election in 2021, Jackson won the State House District 165 seat. She was re-elected in 2022.

== See also ==
- List of first African-American mayors
