= Swing Phi Swing =

African American women's organization

- SΦS
- Founded: April 4, 1969; 57 years ago Winston-Salem State University
- Type: Social Fellowship
- Affiliation: Independent
- Status: Active
- Emphasis: African American
- Scope: National
- Motto: "Perseverance by Virtue"
- Colors: White and Black
- Chapters: 36 active
- Members: 10,000 active
- Nickname: Swings
- Headquarters: P.O. Box 1124; Dearborn, Michigan 48121; United States
- Website: www.swingphiswing.org

Swing Phi Swing Social Fellowship, Inc. (SΦS) is an African-American non-profit social fellowship for female students, as opposed to a traditional Greek-lettered sorority. It was founded in 1969 at Winston Salem State University in Winston-Salem, North Carolina. It has more than fifty undergraduate and graduate chapters across the United States, mostly affiliated with historical Black colleges and universities.

== History ==
Swing Phi Swing was founded at Winston Salem State University in Winston-Salem, North Carolina on April 4, 1969, the first anniversary of the assassination of Dr. Martin Luther King, Jr. Its founders were twelve African-American women, helped by the brothers of Groove Phi Groove.

The twelve founders were:

- Jeanette Butler
- Anita Chase (Watson)
- Beverly Dorn (Steele)
- Finesia Dunovant (Walker)
- Jane Harris (Madison)
- Rosiland Marshall (Tandy)
- Marilyn Reid (Hill)
- Patricia Story (Edwards)
- Ellen Tomlinson (Carter)
- Brenda Travers (Satterfield)
- Lorraine Watkins (Phillips)
- Talma Woods (Brayboy)

The founders wanted to challenge the traditional Black Greek-lettered organizations by creating a fellowship of women committed to community service, promoting and achieving academic excellence, and strengthening community involvement and engagement through culturally conscious events and activities. Thus, their group was an alternative to sororities and actively criticized the missions and programming of Black Greek letter organizations. Swing Phi Swing was incorporated in North Carolina in February 1971.

During the 1970s, Swing Phi Swing's membership grew as Black college women across the South, the Midwest and the East Coast heard of an afro-centric organization; the organization and its members were more political and were "invested in Afrocentricity and Black Power". IChapters were started at prominent historically Black colleges and universities such as Hampton University (Hampton Institute), Morgan State University, Tuskegee University, Wilberforce University, Shaw University and North Carolina Agricultural and Technical State University.

Swing Phi Swing grew so quickly that it was difficult to keep up with processing new memberships. In 1982, the society decided to discontinue intact of undergraduate members so that it could focus on establishing the group at the national level. In addition, the new collegiate members were close in age to the founders and "did not show deference to their elders". In spring 1992, new members were admitted at Pennsylvania State University and the University of Pennsylvania, marking the return of undergraduate chapters. By the end of 1999, Swing Phi Swing had 5,000 members. nationwide. In 2008, it had 20,000 members.

On April 4, 2019, Swing Phi Swing celebrated their 50th anniversary in Winston-Salem, North Carolina. Ten of the surviving founders attended the convention and were present to dedicate a monument to the organization on the campus of Winston-Salem State University. Swing Phi Swing also made a $25,000 donation to the university for a scholarship fund.

Swing has chartered over fifty graduate and undergraduate chapters throughout the United States. As of 2016, it has over 10,000 members. It is the sister organization of Groove Phi Grove.

== Symbols ==
Swing Phi Swing is an acronym for Sisters With Interest Never Gone (Swing), Promoting Higher Intelligence (Phi), and Supporting Women In Need of Growth (Swing).

Swing Phi Swing's motto is "Perseverance by Virtue". Its colors are white and black. Its members are called the Swings.

== Activities ==
Swing Phi Swing is focused on community service. Its national initiatives include African American health, Global Outreach & Optimism in the Diaspora, mentoring, and Supplies for Success which provides resources to students and teachers.

== Governance ==
The National Organization of Swing Phi Swing Social Fellowship is managed and operated by a Board of Directors and Executive Officers, consisting of a national president, vice president, graduate affairs officer, undergraduate affairs officer, historian, media affairs and public relations, corresponding secretary, recording secretary, parliamentarian, and undergraduate representation. Its national office is located in Dearborn, Michigan.

== Chapters ==
=== Undergraduate chapters ===
Following are the undergraduate chapters of Swing Phi Swing, with active chapters indicated in bold and inactive chapters in italics.

Chapter	Charter date and range	Institution	Location	Status	Ref.
Groove	April 4, 1969	Winston-Salem State University	Winston-Salem, North Carolina	Active	
Abeo Neema		University of Michigan	Ann Arbor, Michigan	Inactive	
Aggie		North Carolina A&T State University	Greensboro, North Carolina	Inactive	
Ainka Makeda Marali Moliehi		Pennsylvania State University	State College, Pennsylvania	Inactive	
As-Aslum		Wilberforce University	Wilberforce, Ohio	Inactive	
Andile Engara		University of North Carolina at Greensboro	Greensboro, North Carolina	Inactive	
Awon Egbe Obirin Otito		Grambling State University	Grambling, Louisiana	Inactive	
Ebony		Benedict College	Columbia, South Carolina	Inactive	
Ebony		South Carolina State University	Orangeburg, South Carolina	Inactive	
Endesha Baraka Eagle		Coppin State University	Baltimore, Maryland	Inactive	
**Gendaga Bimbisha Tabu**		Lincoln University	Lincoln University, Lower Oxford Township, Pennsylvania	Active	
Golden		Johnson C. Smith University	Charlotte, North Carolina	Inactive	
Harambee II	January 15, 1974	Clark Atlanta University	Atlanta, Georgia	Inactive	
Harambee II	January 15, 1974	Spelman College	Atlanta, Georgia	Inactive	
Kwanzaa		Texas Southern University	Houston, Texas	Inactive	
Maatkare Hatshepsut Bulldog		Bowie State University	Bowie, Maryland	Inactive	
**Maisha New Birth**		University of Maryland Eastern Shore	Princess Anne, Maryland	Active	
Maraabe		Drexel University	Philadelphia, Pennsylvania	Inactive	
Maraabe		Rosemont College	Rosemont, Pennsylvania	Inactive	
Maraabe		Temple University	Philadelphia, Pennsylvania	Inactive	
Maraabe		University of Pennsylvania	Philadelphia, Pennsylvania	Inactive	
**Marali Nubia Bear**		Morgan State University	Baltimore, Maryland	Active	
**Marali Nubia Bear**		Towson University	Towson, Maryland	Active	
**Marali Nubia Bear**		University of Maryland, Baltimore County	Catonsville, Maryland	Active	
Masika Ghayda Niara		College of New Rochelle	New Rochelle, New York	Inactive	
**Matumaini Ya Baadaye**		Buffalo State University	Buffalo, New York	Inactive	
**Muntu**		Shaw University	Raleigh, North Carolina	Active	
Nandi		Rutgers University		Inactive	
Nakawa Warriors		Eastern Michigan University	Ypsilanti, Michigan	Inactive	
Ndada Amuka Kwa Pindua		Adelphi University	Garden City, New York	Active	
**Ndada Vumilia Daima Inuka**		Mercy University	Dobbs Ferry, New York	Active	
**Ndada Weuse Panda**		Bloomfield College	Bloomfield, New Jersey	Active	
**Ndada Weuse Panda**		Kean University		Active	
**Ndada Weuse Panda**		Montclair State University	Montclair, New Jersey	Active	
Nehanda Bison		Howard University	Washington, D.C.	Inactive	
**Nguvu Katika Mwanzo Mpya**		Loyola University New Orleans	New Orleans, Louisiana	Inactive	
**Nyawela Chic Wolverine**		Cheyney University of Pennsylvania	Cheyney, Pennsylvania	Inactive	
Nkijha		St. Augustine's University	Raleigh, North Carolina	Inactive	
Odu Ifa		Virginia Commonwealth University	Richmond, Virginia	Inactive	
Orita		Prairie View A&M University	Prairie View, Texas	Active	
**Osei Fola Simba**		Syracuse University	Syracuse, New York	Inactive	
SOBU		North Carolina Central University	Durham, North Carolina	Inactive	
Spartan		Norfolk State University	Norfolk, Virginia	Inactive	
**Subira Chemwuapu**		Johnson & Wales University	Providence, Rhode Island	Active	
SUNY		University at Albany, SUNY	Albany, New York	Inactive	
Siyanda		East Carolina University	Greenville, North Carolina	Inactive	
Umoja		Livingstone College	Salisbury, North Carolina	Inactive	
Upenda		Hampton University	Hampton, Virginia	Inactive	
Viking		Elizabeth City State University	Elizabeth City, North Carolina	Inactive	
Wantu		Virginia State University	Ettrick, Virginia	Inactive	

=== Graduate chapters ===
Following are the graduate chapters of Swing Phi Swing, with active chapters indicated in bold and inactive chapters in italics.

Chapter	Charter date and range	Location	Status	Ref.
**Ajeya**		Central New Jersey	Active	
**Anan Tendaji**		Ypsilanti, Michigan	Active	
Ashanti Zuri		Atlanta, Georgia	Inactive	
**Atlanta**	1983	Atlanta, Georgia	Active	
Boston		Boston, Massachusetts	Inactive	
**Central Carolina**		Durham, North Carolina	Active	
**Central Carolina**		Raleigh, North Carolina	Active	
**Charlotte**		Charlotte, North Carolina	Active	
**Dada Rafiki Tri-County**		Pennsylvania	Active	
**DC Metro**		Washington, D.C.	Active	
**Detroit**		Detroit, Michigan	Active	
DFW		Dallas-Fort Worth, Texas	Inactive	
**Garden State**		Northern New Jersey	Active	
**Greater New York & Connecticut**		Connecticut	Active	
**Greater New York & Connecticut**		New York	Active	
Hampton Roads		Hampton Roads, Virginia	Inactive	
**Haraambe Nssa**		Fayetteville, North Carolina	Active	
**Houston**		Houston, Texas	Active	
**Imani Kuumba**	March 5, 2011	New Jersey	Active	(Note: Imani means "faith" and Kuumba means "Creativity".)
**Kemet PA**		Pennsylvania	Active	
**Los Angeles**		Los Angeles, California	Active	
Mid South		Memphis, Tennessee	Inactive	
**New Jersey Zuri Obinrin Abike Aye'**		New Jersey	Active	
**Nia Maryland**		Baltimore, Maryland	Active	
**Niara Atanipenda**		Greensboro, North Carolina	Active	
**Niara Atanipenda**		High Point, North Carolina	Active	
**Okimma Delaware**		Delaware	Active	
**Paidamoyo Potomac**		Maryland	Active	
**Paidamoyo Potomac**		Virginia	Active	
**Paidamoyo Potomac**		Washington, D.C.	Active	
**Palmetto**		Charleston, South Carolina	Active	
**Philadelphia**		Philadelphia, Pennsylvania	Active	
**Portland**		Portland, Oregon	Active	
**Raleigh**		Raleigh, North Carolina	Active	
Richmond		Richmond, Virginia	Inactive	
**Rukiya Busara Piedmont Triad**		Winston-Salem, North Carolina	Active	
**Sankofa**		Las Vegas, Nevada	Active	
SC Nkiruka		South Carolina	Active	
**Siku Mpya Sunshine State**		Florida	Active	
**Tri-State**		Connecticut	Active	
**Tri-State**		New Jersey	Active	
**Tri-State**		New York	Active	
