= Al Williams (politician) =

American politician from Georgia

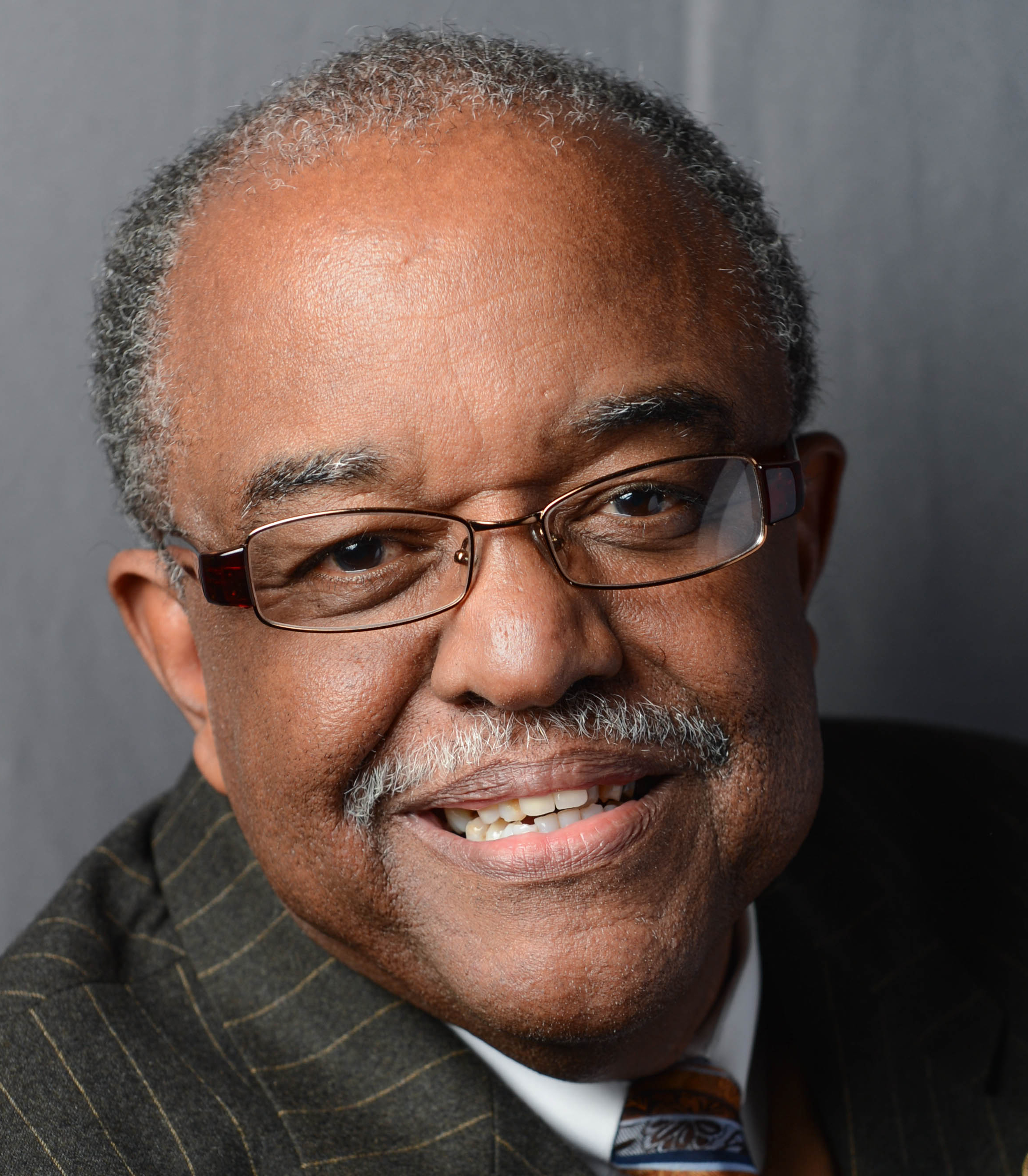

Member of the Georgia House of Representatives
- Incumbent
- Assumed office January 13, 2003
- Preceded by: E. C. Tillman
- Constituency: 128th district (2003–2005); 165th district (2005–2013); 168th district (2013–present)

Personal details
- Born: Al Williams; August 2, 1947 (age 78) Midway, Georgia, U.S.
- Party: Democratic

Al Williams (born August 2, 1947) is an American politician. He is a member of the Georgia House of Representatives from the 168th District, serving since 2002. He is a member of the Democratic Party.

Williams was born and raised in Liberty County, where his grandfather was the first Black registered voter in the county's history. He doorknocked at the age of 13 for John F. Kennedy during his 1960 presidential campaign, and participated in both the 1963 March on Washington and the 1968 Selma to Montgomery marches. He was jailed seventeen times during the Civil Rights Movement. Williams also served during the Vietnam War.

He attended Liberty County High School and pursued his education at Saint Leo University and John Marshall Law School.

While serving as a state legislator, Williams also served as the deacon of Calvary Missionary Baptist Church in Richmond Hill.
