= Groove Phi Groove =

African American Social Fellowship

- GΦG
- Founded: October 12, 1962; 64 years ago Morgan State University
- Type: Social fellowship
- Affiliation: Independent
- Status: Active
- Emphasis: African-American, Service
- Scope: International
- Motto: "Through loyalty and integrity, we shall achieve greatness."
- Colors: Black and White
- Symbol: Sword and shield
- Publication: The Sword & Spear
- Chapters: 102 active college 57 active graduate
- Members: 60,000+ lifetime
- Nickname: Grooves, G-Phi-G
- Headquarters: 2453 Maryland Avenue; Baltimore, Maryland 21218; United States
- Website: www.groove-phi-groove.com

Groove Phi Groove Social Fellowship, Inc. (GΦG) is an international African American social fellowship. It was founded in 1962 at Morgan State College (now Morgan State University) in Baltimore, Maryland as an alternative to mainstream historically black fraternities. As of 2022, it has chartered more than 200 college and graduate chapters.

== History ==
Groove Phi Groove was founded on October 12, 1962, at Morgan State College in Baltimore, Maryland by a group of young black men who wanted to create an alternative to what was described as the traditionalism of subjectively ascribed established fraternal organizations. Its founders or 14 Pearls were Glen Brown, Raymond Clark, John Edward Conquest, Walter Edwin Goodwin, Barry H. Hampton, James L. Hill, Charlie Johnson, Nathaniel Monroe, David Nesbit, Nathaniel Parham Sr., Harry Payne, Barry Simms, Robert E. Simpson, and Woodrow Anderson WIlliams. The organization's purposes included creating a fellowship for Black college men, encouraging academics and ethical standards, and community service.

Although it had yet to be recognized as a student organization by Morgan State, the Groove Phi Groove started a second chapter at Delaware State University. This was followed by chapters at Allen University, Benedict College, Claflin College, Johnson C. Smith University, Lincoln University, North Carolina Central University, South Carolina State University, and Virginia Union University. Eventually, it established 135 collegiate chapters across the United States.

Groove Phi Groove members were active in the civil rights movement in Baltimore and other cities, participating in marches and demonstrations. The Lincoln University chapter led the establishment of a chapter of the NAACP on campus.

In 1994, the group had 100 college chapters and fifty graduate chapters. On December 26, 2012, Groove Phi Groove purchased a property in Baltimore, Maryland, for its international headquarters; it was dedicated on July 1, 2013.

== Symbols ==
The founders' selection of the name Groove Phi Groove incorporated a popular word in the 1960s, meaning "smooth, quick, and skillfull", to "work against the current establishment", and "socializing or fellowshipping". "Phi" came from the symbol for the male reproductive system or the "fire of life", created by the Khemit people of ancient Egypt. Although the symbol "Φ" looks like the Greek letter, the two symbols have different meanings.

Groove Phi Groove's motto is "Through loyalty and integrity, we shall achieve greatness". Its colors are black, indicating race, and white, indicating purity. Its symbols are the sword and shield.

The emblem or coat-of-arms of Groove Phi Groove is a shield over a crossed spear and sword. The three chains divide the shield into three sections that bear a beer mug, a stack of books, and a torch. The shield is edged by fourteen pearls. These items are all symbolic:

- Sword - Courage
- Spear - Endurance
- Book - Knowledge amongst college men
- Mug - Fellowship
- Chains - Unification of their brotherhood
- Torch - Everlasting light
- Pearls - The Fourteen Founders of Groove Phi Groove

Groove Phi Groove's publication is The Sword & Spear. Its nicknames are Grooves and G-Phi-G. Its members are called "fellowmen" because Groove Phi Groove is known for positive social exchanges or "fellowshipping". Pledges are called "swanXmen".

== Activities ==
Groove Phi Groove actively supports and participates in various programs and projects that aim to serve the communities in which its members live. Some members participate in step dance and A cappella performances.

Groove Phi Groove's national philanthropies have included the Boy Scouts of America, Missing Children, NAACP, National Urban League, and UNCF. Through The Groove Fund, Incorporated, a 501(c)(3) not-for-profit charitable entity which was established in 2012, it also supports scholarships and a tutoring program. Its Groove Community Foundation is a (501)(c)(3) non-profit organization that supports the community service activities of Groove Phi Groove and also sponsors a leadership academy.

== Membership ==
Groove Phi Groove was originally all-Black, but the group became interracial in the 1970s. Membership is through mutual section. College students who have completed twelve credit hours and a cumulative GPA of 2.5 are eligible for memberships. Graduate candidates for membership must have a degree from a four-year college, a two-year college, a community college, or a business school.

Dual membership is allowed in academic or honor societies, as well as general fraternal orders such as the Benevolent and Protective Order of Elks, the Freemasons, and the United States Junior Chamber.

== Governance ==
The governing structure of the Groove Phi Groove consists of its international conclave, an executive board of directors, an international directorate and staff, regional offices, and local chapters. The conclave or national convention meets annually. It includes the delegates meeting where the executive board is elected. Conclaves are often held in conjunction with Swing Phi Swing, Groove Phi Groove's sister organization.

Groove Phi Groove is a 501(c)(7) not-for-profit entity. The international headquarters of Groove Phi Groove Social Fellowship, Inc. is at 2453 Maryland Avenue in Baltimore, Maryland.

== Chapters ==
As of 2022, Groove Phi Groove has chartered more than 200 college and graduate chapters, including 135 college chapters. In 2025, it had five active college and five active graduate chapters.

== Notable members ==
In 2022, Groove Phi Groove had initiated more than 60,000 members. Following are some of its notable members.

- Spider Bennett, professional basketball player
- G. K. Butterfield, United States House of Representatives
- Clarence "Tiger" Davis, Maryland House of Delegates 1983–2007
- Chet Grimsley, professional football player for the Tampa Bay Buccaneers
- Richard Huntley professional football player with the Pittsburgh Steelers and Atlanta Falcons
- Kamal Johnson, professional football player
- Ralph C. Johnson, North Carolina House of Representatives
- Earl Monroe, professional basketball player with the Baltimore Bullets and the New York Knicks; member of the Naismith Memorial Basketball Hall of Fame and International Sports Hall of Fame
- Douglas Palmer, Mayor of Trenton, New Jersey
- Sylvester "Junkyard Dog" Ritter, professional wrestler and professional football player with the Houston Oilers
- Donnie Shell, professional football player with the Pittsburgh Steelers and College Football and Pro Football Hall of Fame member

== Member and chapter misconduct ==
=== Contract killing ===
In April 1984, several members of Groove Phi Groove at Cheyney University were implicated in the December 1983 contract killing of Ellen B. Lewis, a student who was also a police informant. The university had suspended the Groove Phi Groove chapter in 1983 for undisclosed violations. Law enforcement described G-Phi-G member and chapter president Russell Moss Las "the charismatic 'kingpin' of a forgery and stolen-check scam". The United States Secret Service had been investingating Moss for the theft and forgery of government checks. Police suspected that Moss used Groove Phi Groove to recruit other students for criminal activities.

Another G-Phi-G member, Rodney Lawrence "Rashaan" Griffin, was charged with criminal homicide for Lewis's killing and was eventually sentenced to death for the crime. Griffin was previously suspended and banned from the Cheyney campus in the fall of 1983 for bringing a gun to campus and had also been charged with committing a robbery in February 1984.

Moss was charged with ordering the killing in May 2002. Moss, who was an attorney in 2002, was arrested for first-degree murder after new evidence in the case was discovered. Griffin, who was on death row, testified to killing Lewis as a favor for Moss. Moss pled guilty to third-degree murder and solicitation to committ murder. Moss was disbarred for failing to disclose his prior criminal record, that included serving time in prison for an unrelated charge.

=== Branding ===
In November 1972, North Carolina Central University football player Garvin Stone noted that the "G" on his arm was burned into his arm during his initiation into Groove Phi Groove. Luther "Gunpowder" Howard, a Delaware State University football player, had two brands as a member of Groove Phi Groove. The branding iron was made from a coathanger. Howard noted that getting branding was "not really necessary, but I wanted it. I like to be different."

=== Hazing ===
In March 1987, three Groove Phi Groove pledges from the North Carolina Central University chapter were injured and hospitalized because of a hazing incident. The pledges were hit by a car around 2 a.m. after being stranded in the middle of a rural unpaved road while being hooded and blindfolded. The university suspended two members for a semester and the Groove Phi Groove chapter for five years for hazing. One of the injured pledges sued Groove Phi Groove for damages in March 1990.

== See also ==
- List of African-American fraternities and sororities
- List of social fraternities
