= Juanita Williams =

Juanita Williams may refer to:

- Juanita Williams, singer of an album released by Golden World Records
- Juanita Williams, survivor of Delta Air Lines Flight 191
- Juanita Terry Williams (1925–2000), member of the Georgia House of Representatives in 1985–93, and spouse of civil rights leader Hosea Williams

== See also ==
- Juanita Wilson, Irish director and writer
