= Malcolm Roderick Maclean =

American politician (1919–2001)

Malcolm Roderick Maclean (September 14, 1919 – January 24, 2001) was a politician from Georgia, United States and was a former Mayor of Savannah. He was a Democrat and belonged to the local Citizen's Committee faction of the party.

== Background ==
He was born in East Hampton, New York. He moved to Savannah, Georgia, with his family when he was young and graduated from Yale University in 1941 and Harvard Law School in 1948. He was married to Frances Ravenel Grimball, served in the U.S. Navy from 1941 to 1952 and was promoted to the rank of lieutenant commander and was an attorney. He was a named partner in the Savannah Law Firm of Hunter, Maclean, Exley, & Dunn, now known as HunterMaclean.

== Political career ==
=== Alderman ===
Maclean succeeded Dr. Ellison Cook as a Council member in 1957 and became Mayor Pro Tem in 1958.

=== Mayor ===
After the resignation of incumbent Mayor Lee Mingledorff Jr. who decided to run for a seat on the Chatham County Commission in 1960, Maclean was selected by his peers to take over the Chief Executive's job. He then served the remainder of Mingledorff's term, which expired in 1962.

Maclean won re-election in 1962. He continued Mingledorff's local programs of public road improvements.

During the Savannah Protest Movement, he worked with civil rights activists such as Westley Wallace Law and Eugene Gadsden and public facilities were integrated under his tenure.

In 1966, Maclean suffered a white backlash. Savannah voters, who had given Republican presidential candidate Barry Goldwater a majority in 1964, defeated Maclean and his slate. Republican businessman Julius Curtis Lewis Jr. succeeded Maclean as mayor.

== Footnotes ==
Political offices
Preceded by Lee Mingledorff Jr., Democrat	Mayor of Savannah; 1960–1966	Succeeded by Julius Curtis Lewis Jr., Republican
