= Earl Shinhoster =

American civil rights activist (1950–2000)

Executive Director of the National Association for the Advancement of Colored People
- In office 1994–1996
- Preceded by: Benjamin Chavis
- Succeeded by: Kweisi Mfume (President and CEO)

Personal details
- Born: July 5, 1950 Savannah, Georgia, U.S.
- Died: June 11, 2000 (aged 49) near Montgomery, Alabama, U.S.
- Education: Morehouse College (BA); Cleveland State University

Earl Theodore Shinhoster (July 5, 1950 – June 11, 2000) was a Black civil rights activist in Savannah, Georgia.

Shinhoster was born in Savannah in 1950 to Nadine and Willie Shinhoster, he was an alumnus of Morehouse College and Cleveland State University. As a teenager, he was involved in the Civil Rights Movement. In 1994–95, he served as interim executive director of the National Association for the Advancement of Colored People (NAACP).

Shinhoster died near Montgomery, Alabama, in a car collision in 2000.

In 2001 the Georgia Legislature passed a resolution to designate the Earl T. Shinhoster Interchange and the Earl T. Shinhoster Bridge to honor him.

== See also ==
- Dorothy Barnes Pelote
- Curtis Cooper
- Ralph Mark Gilbert
- W. W. Law

Non-profit organization positions
Preceded by Benjamin Chavis	Executive Director of the National Association for the Advancement of Colored People; 1994–1996	Succeeded by Kweisi Mfume as President and CEO of the National Association for the Advancement of Colored People
