= Ralph Gilbert =

Ralph Gilbert may refer to:

- Ralph Waldo Emerson Gilbert (1882–1939), U.S. Representative from Kentucky
- Ralph Mark Gilbert (1899–1956), American civil rights leader and Baptist minister
