= Vernon Johns =

American pastor and public intellectual (1892–1965)

Dr. Vernon Johns
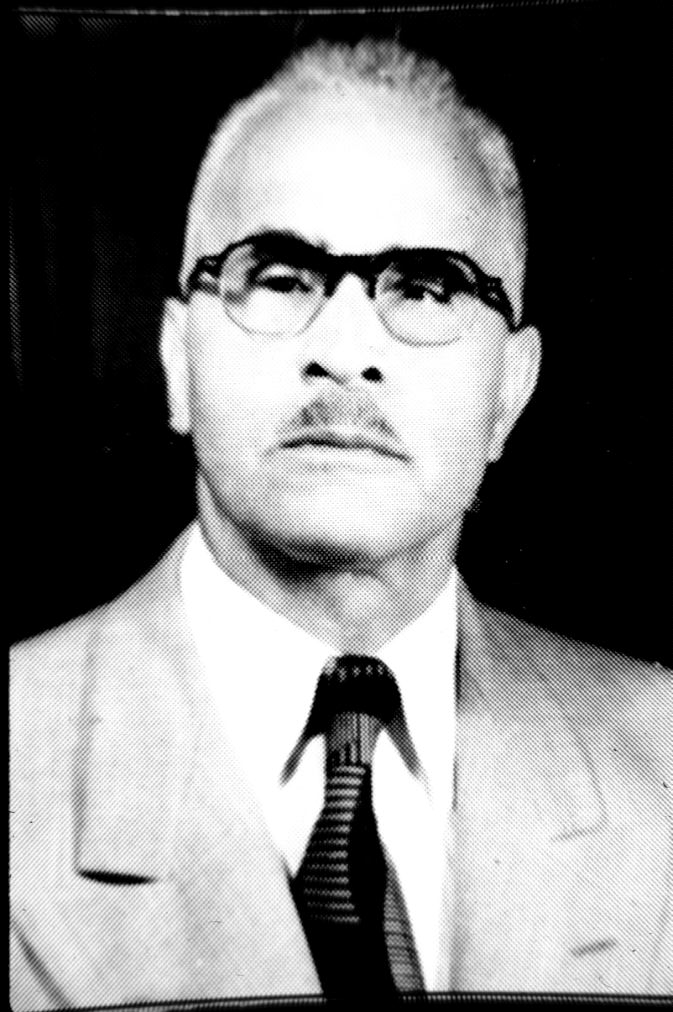
- Vernon Johns
- Born: April 22, 1892; Darlington Heights, Virginia
- Died: June 11, 1965 (aged 73); Washington, D.C.
- Education: Oberlin Seminary; University of Chicago
- Movement: Civil Rights Movement
- Spouse: Altona Trent
- Children: Six children

Dr. Vernon Johns (April 22, 1892 – June 11, 1965) was an American minister based in the South and a pioneer in the civil rights movement. He is best known as the pastor (1947–52) of the Dexter Avenue Baptist Church in Montgomery, Alabama. He was succeeded there by Dr. Martin Luther King Jr.

Johns was widely known in the black community across the South for his profound scholarship in the classics, his intellect, and his highly controversial and outspoken sermons on race relations, which were ahead of his time.

== Life ==
Johns was born in Darlington Heights, Prince Edward County, Virginia. Three of his grandparents had been enslaved. His paternal grandfather was hanged for killing his master. Johns's maternal grandfather was a white man named Mr. Price. Price had a long-standing relationship with Johns's maternal grandmother. After killing another white man who tried to rape her, Price was convicted and served prison time. When Johns's maternal grandmother died young, her daughter Sallie Price (who later became Johns's mother) was raised by Price's white wife. The fact that Price was the father of the mixed-race girl Sallie was not generally acknowledged.

In 1915, Johns graduated from Virginia Theological Seminary and College. He attended the Oberlin Seminary, where he studied with classmate Robert M. Hutchins. While at Oberlin, Johns was highly respected by both his classmates and the faculty; he was chosen to give the annual student oration. After graduating from Oberlin in 1918, he attended the University of Chicago's graduate school of theology.

After studying at the University of Chicago, Johns was called as a preacher to various congregations in Virginia, West Virginia, and Pennsylvania. In 1926, he was the first African American to have his work published in Best Sermons of the Year.

In 1927, Johns married Altona Trent. She was a pianist and music teacher who became a professor at what is now Alabama State University. In 1929–33 Johns served as president of Lynchburg's Virginia Theological Seminary and College. He was unable to stabilize the school's finances and was forced to resign. He returned to his family farm for several years.

In 1937 Johns was called again as a pastor of First Baptist Church in Charleston, West Virginia. In 1941, Johns returned to Lynchburg as pastor of Court Street Baptist Church, but was quickly forced to resign by the congregation and returned to the farm.

His wife's connection to ASU enabled her to influence Dexter Avenue Baptist Church to hire Johns as pastor in October 1948. On one occasion, he paid his fare on a bus in Montgomery, and was directed to the back in the custom of segregated seating. He refused to sit there and demanded, and got, his money back. He sometimes ruffled feathers among his upper- and middle-class congregation by selling his farm produce outside the church building.

Johns's niece, Barbara Johns, led a student strike in Prince Edward County, Virginia in 1951. Ultimately she was involved in a suit against the county, Davis vs. Prince Edward County. This was one of five cases that was combined in the Brown vs. Board of Education of Topeka suit that reached the U.S. Supreme Court. It ruled that segregation of public schools was unconstitutional and urged states to desegregate such facilities. Ms. Johns noted that one of her inspirations was her uncle, the Rev. Dr. Johns.

In May 1953, Johns was forced to resign as pastor in Montgomery and was succeeded by Martin Luther King Jr. He returned to his family farm, where he spent the rest of his life.

Vernon Johns died of a heart attack in Washington, D.C., on June 11, 1965, at age 73.

== Legacy ==
A television film, Road to Freedom: The Vernon Johns Story (1994), written by Leslie Lee and Kevin Arkadie, was based on an unpublished biography by Henry W. Powell of The Vernon Johns Society. It was directed by Kenneth Fink and stars James Earl Jones in the title role. Former NBA player Kareem Abdul-Jabbar was the film's co-executive producer.

David Anderson Elementary School in Petersburg, Virginia, was renamed as Vernon Johns Middle School. In 2009 it was adapted as the junior high school for the city school system.

== See also ==
- Ralph Luker, editor of the Vernon Johns Papers
