= Darlington Heights, Virginia =

Unincorporated community in Virginia, United States

Darlington Heights
- Unincorporated community
- Location within the Commonwealth of Virginia Darlington Heights (the United States)
- Coordinates: 37°12′01″N 78°36′15″W
- Country: United States
- State: Virginia
- County: Prince Edward
- Elevation: 600 ft (180 m)
- Time zone: UTC-5 (Eastern (EST))
  - Summer (DST): UTC-4 (EDT)
- GNIS feature ID: 1477247

Darlington Heights is an unincorporated community in Prince Edward County, Virginia, United States.

== Notable person ==
- Vernon Johns, minister and pioneer in the civil rights movement
