= Ralph Mark Gilbert Civil Rights Museum =

Museum in Savannah, Georgia

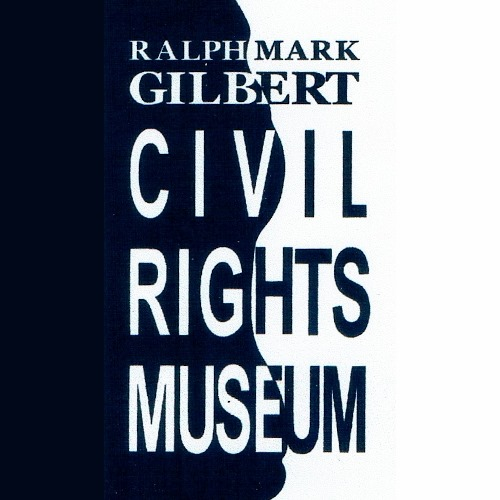

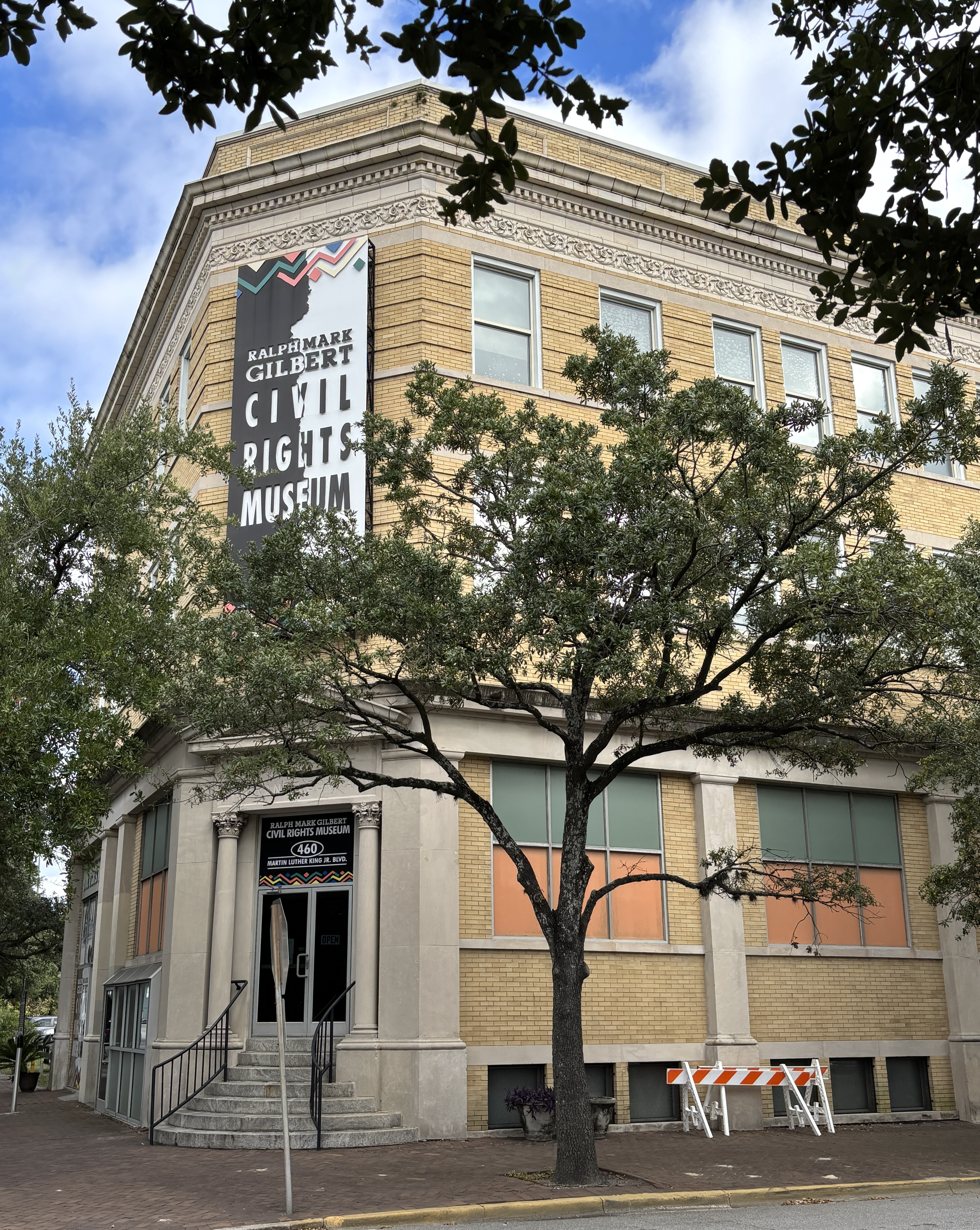
- Exterior
- Established: 1996
- Location: 460 Martin Luther King Jr. Boulevard; Savannah, Georgia, United States
- Coordinates: 32.07235°N 81.09982°W
- Type: Civil Rights
- Executive director: Vaughnette Goode-Walker
- Website: rmgcivilrightsmuseum.com

The Ralph Mark Gilbert Civil Rights Museum is a museum in Savannah, Georgia, United States. named after Ralph Mark Gilbert, who served as pastor of the First African Baptist Church from 1939 to 1956 and led the Savannah chapter of the NAACP starting in the 1940s. The museum documents the civil rights experiences of Savannah and Georgia's African American community. Its three floors contain photographic records, interactive displays, a recreation of the Azalea Room at Levy's Department Store, a lunch counter, a fiber-optic map of historic events and sites, and exhibits focused on the NAACP and Laurel Grove South Cemetery.

== History ==
The museum was established in 1996. Funding came from a local sales tax in Chatham County, and the local Association for the Study of African American Life and History assumed operation, with W. W. Law as its then president. The museum occupies a building constructed in 1914, originally used as an African American bank and later as the NAACP Savannah chapter headquarters. The museum documents the civil rights history of Savannah and Georgia, with exhibits on local activism, key figures, and significant events related to the civil rights movement.

== Exhibits and layout ==
The museum spans three floors with exhibits highlighting the local civil rights movement. The first floor features historic photographs, a bronze bust of Ralph Mark Gilbert, and a recreation of the Azalea Room from Levy's Department Store, where Black customers could shop but not dine. There is also an NAACP organization exhibit and a fiber-optic map showing eighty-seven civil rights sites and events in Savannah.

The mezzanine contains a theater designed like an African American church sanctuary, where leaders reflect on the city's civil rights history. The second floor includes lecture halls, classrooms, a computer room, a video and reading room, and a collection of African American children's books. Exhibits document key protests, voter registration efforts, and local civil rights leaders, providing visitors with educational resources on Savannah's civil rights struggles.

== Eloria S. Gilbert Archives ==
The archives was created to house the papers of Reverend Dr. Ralph Mark Gilbert. The collection arrived at the museum on July 8, 2020, donated by Eloria S. Gilbert, Reverend Gilbert's widow. The archives include hundreds of typewritten sermons delivered by Gilbert as pastor of the First African Baptist Church, scripts of passion plays written and performed in Savannah, and documents related to his work with the NAACP at local and state levels.

In the 1940s, while Reverend Gilbert led the local and state NAACP chapters, Mrs. Gilbert worked to establish other chapters across Georgia. She also served as an NAACP field representative and lecturer in more than 25 cities. After Reverend Gilbert died in 1956, Mrs. Gilbert maintained the archive of his writings and donated them to the museum bearing his name in 2020. The museum plans to add Eloria S. Gilbert's papers to the collection in the future.

== See also ==
- Savannah Protest Movement

== Bibliography ==
- Billingsley, Andrew (1999). Mighty Like a River: The Black Church and Social Reform. Oxford University Press. p. 53. ISBN 978-0-19-802658-7 – via Google Books.
