= Elisabeth Omilami =

American actress and humanitarian

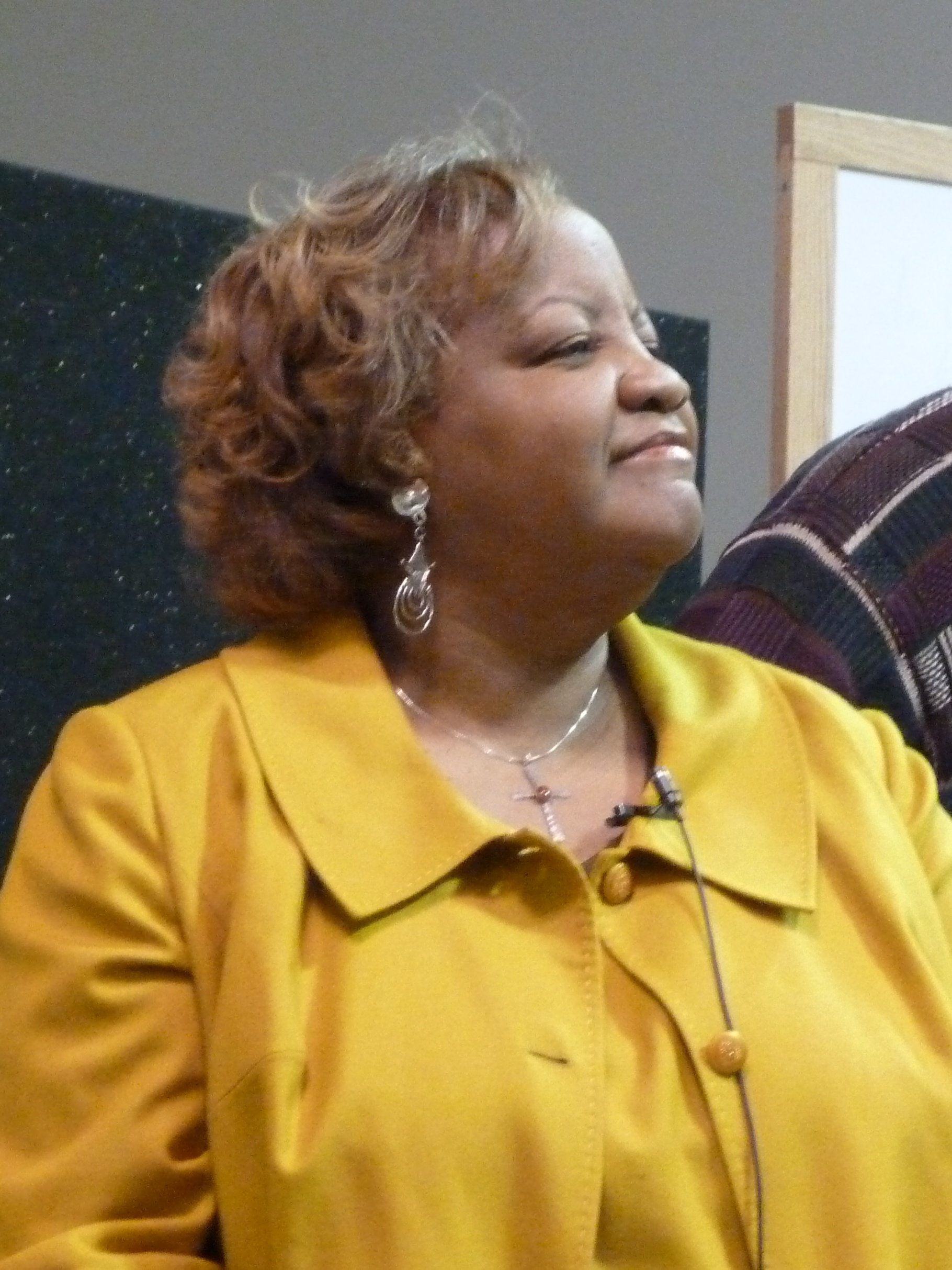
- Omilami in 2011
- Born: Elisabeth Williams; February 18, 1951 (age 75); Atlanta, Georgia, U.S.
- Education: Hampton University
- Occupations: Actress; humanitarian; civil rights activist
- Spouse: Afemo Omilami
- Children: 2
- Parents: Hosea Williams; Juanita T. Williams

Elisabeth Omilami (née Williams; born February 18, 1951) is an American actress and activist. A daughter of civil rights activists Hosea Williams and Juanita T. Williams, she took part in demonstrations as a child. She later founded an Atlanta theatre company and acted in film and television. Since 2000, she has led the relief organization now known as Hosea Helps.

== Early life and education ==
Omilami was born in Atlanta. Her parents involved her in demonstrations across the South, and she was arrested 11 times at civil-rights protests before she was 14. During the 1960s she attended Wasatch Academy, a boarding school in Utah. She earned a bachelor's degree in theatre from Hampton University. As an adult, she continued to demonstrate with her father, including at a march opposing the Ku Klux Klan in Forsyth County, Georgia, during the 1980s.

== Acting and theatre career ==
After college, Omilami co-founded the People's Survival Theatre, one of Atlanta's early theatre companies. The company staged five productions a year, and its summer program provided arts instruction for children. She later worked as an arts administrator in New York before returning to Atlanta.

Omilami appeared in the television series In the Heat of the Night and had a recurring role as Joelyn in I'll Fly Away. Her film roles include A Time to Kill, Ray, and The Blind Side. She also wrote plays, including There Is a River in My Soul.

== Humanitarian work ==
Omilami joined her father's organization, Hosea Feed the Hungry and Homeless, full-time in 1995. She took over its leadership after his death in 2000. Under Omilami, the organization expanded beyond holiday meals to distribute food during the week and provide rent assistance and other services. It later adopted the name Hosea Helps. Omilami has served as its president and chief executive.

== Personal life ==
Omilami is married to actor Afemo Omilami. They have two children.
