= Lee Mingledorff Jr. =

American politician (1914–1985)

Walter Lee Mingledorff Jr. (November 7, 1914 – February 18, 1985) was a politician from Georgia, United States, and was a former Mayor of Savannah. He was a Democrat and belonged to the local Citizen's Committee faction of the party.

== Background ==
He was born in the Savannah area and made a career in the shipyard industry. He was married to Huldah Cail.

== Political career ==
=== City politics ===
Mingledorff ran for Mayor of Savannah and defeated Conservative Democratic candidate Charles Musante in 1954. He took office on January 24, 1955 and became the first Savannah mayor to serve under the council-manager form of municipal government. The number of aldermen was reduced from twelve to six under the new city charter.

He was re-elected for a two-year term in 1956 with his second term beginning January 21, 1957 and for a four-year term in 1958.

The Mingledorff administration is credited with a number of accomplishments, including:

- Eliminating the city's deficit
- Establishing a municipal civil service
- Implementing an urban renewal program
- Improving the road system, with the construction of expressways

=== County politics ===
Mingledorff resigned as mayor on August 1, 1960 to become a candidate on the Chatham County Commission. He was succeeded as Mayor by vice-mayor Malcolm Maclean for the remainder of his term running through October 1, 1962.

Political offices
Preceded by Olin Fulmer	Mayor of Savannah; 1955–1960	Succeeded by Malcolm Maclean
