= Ralph Luker =

American historian (1940–2015)

- Born: Ralph Edlin Luker; March 1, 1940; Louisville, Kentucky, U.S.
- Died: August 8, 2015 (aged 75); Atlanta, Georgia, U.S.
- Education: Duke University (BA); Drew University (BD); University of North Carolina at Chapel Hill (MA, PhD)
- Occupations: Historian; educator; author
- Children: 2

Ralph Edlin Luker (March 1, 1940 – August 8, 2015) was an American historian, teacher, and the author of several books about race, religion and the Civil Rights Movement.

Luker was born in Louisville, Kentucky, and received his B.A. from Duke University in 1962, a B.D. from Drew University in 1966, and then both an M.A. (1969) and Ph.D. (1973) from the University of North Carolina, Chapel Hill.

Luker founded the Cliopatria history group blog on the History News Network of George Mason University's Center for History and New Media. He closed Cliopatria in March 2012 after moderating this group blog for eight and a quarter years.

Luker had taught in departments of history at Allegheny College, Antioch College, and Morehouse College, and in departments of religion at Lincoln University (Pennsylvania) and Virginia Polytechnic Institute and State University.

Luker lived in Arden, Delaware, from 1980 until 1986 when he and his family (wife and two daughters) moved to Atlanta, Georgia, to begin work on The Papers of Martin Luther King, Jr.

In 1994, when he was assistant professor of history at Antioch College, Luker was denied tenure after accusations of racism by some students. Outraged by the charges, Luker underwent a hunger-strike but to no avail.

Ralph E. Luker died in Atlanta, Georgia, on August 8, 2015.

== Writing ==
Books

- The Man Who Started Freedom: The Essays, Sermons and Speeches of Vernon Johns. Critical edition of the papers of Vernon Johns, the father of the American civil rights movement.
- 1996: Historical Dictionary of the Civil Rights Movement, 1941-1995. The Scarecrow Press, Inc. Hardcover: ISBN 0-8108-3163-5.
- 1996: Black and White Sat Down Together: The Reminiscences of an NAACP Founder. The Feminist Press at CUNY. Hardcover: ISBN 1-55861-099-5. (See also: Mary White Ovington.)
- 1992: The Papers of Martin Luther King, Jr., Volume I: Called to Serve, January 1929 - June 1951. Clayborne Carson, Ralph E. Luker, Penny A. Russell, eds. University of California Press. Hardcover: ISBN 978-0-520-07950-2.
- 1994: The Papers of Martin Luther King, Jr., Volume II: Rediscovering Precious Values, July 1951 - November 1955. Clayborne Carson, Ralph E. Luker, Penny A. Russell, Peter Holloran, eds. University of California Press. Hardcover: ISBN 978-0-520-07951-9.

- Sponsored by the Martin Luther King, Jr. Center for Nonviolent Social Change, Emory University and the Stanford University Martin Luther King, Jr. Research and Education Institute.

- 1991: The Social Gospel in Black and White: American Racial Reform, 1885-1912. University of North Carolina Press. Hardcover: ISBN 0-8078-1978-6. Paperback (1998): ISBN 0-8078-4720-8.

- Winner of the 1992 Outstanding Book Award from the Gustavus Myers Center for the Study of Bigotry and Human Rights.

- 1984: A Southern Tradition in Theology and Social Criticism, 1830-1930: The Religious Liberalism and Social Conservatism of James Warley Miles, William Porcher DuBose, and Edgar Gardner Murphy. Edwin Mellen Press. Hardcover: ISBN 0-88946-655-6, ISBN 978-0-88946-655-5.

Periodicals

- American Quarterly
- The Atlanta Journal-Constitution
- Church History: Studies in Christianity and Culture - published since 1932 by the American Society of Church History.
- Journal of American History
- The Journal of Negro History
- New England Quarterly - sponsored by the Massachusetts Historical Society, the Colonial Society of Massachusetts, and Northeastern University, Boston.
- OAH Newsletter - quarterly publication of the Organization of American Historians.
- Perspectives - monthly magazine of the American Historical Association.
- Slavery & Abolition - published by Routledge.
- South Atlantic Quarlerly - published by the Duke University Press.
- Southern Cultures - quarterly publication of the Center for the Study of the American South at the University of North Carolina at Chapel Hill.
- Southern Studies: An Interdisciplinary Journal of the South - published by the Southern Studies Institute of Northwestern State University of Louisiana in Natchitoches, Louisiana.
- The Virginia Quarterly Review
