= Juanita Terry Williams =

American politician and businesswoman

Juanita Terry Williams (January 3, 1925 – August 23, 2000) was an American politician and businesswoman.

Williams received her bachelor's degree in elementary education from Savannah State University in 1957 and her master's degree from Clark Atlanta University in 1967. Williams was an African-American and business consultant. Williams served in the Georgia House of Representatives from 1985 to 1991 and was a Democrat. Her husband was Hosea Williams who also served in the Georgia General Assembly. They lived in Atlanta, Georgia. Williams died from thrombotic thrombocytopenic purpura; a form of anemia in Atlanta, Georgia.
