= W. W. Law =

American civil rights leader (1923–2002)

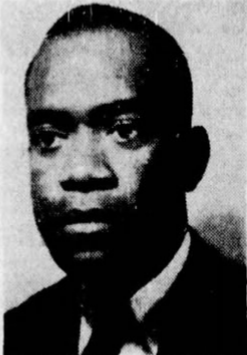
- Born: January 1, 1923; Savannah, Georgia, U.S.
- Died: July 29, 2002 (aged 79); Savannah, Georgia, U.S.
- Resting place: Laurel Grove Cemetery
- Organizations: NAACP; ASALH; Ralph Mark Gilbert Civil Rights Museum
- Movement: Civil Rights Movement

Westley Wallace Law (January 1, 1923 – July 29, 2002) was an American civil rights leader from Savannah, Georgia. He was president of the Savannah chapter of the NAACP and made great strides in desegregation through nonviolent resistance from 1950 to 1976, serving as a leader in the Savannah Protest Movement. He spent much of the rest of his life advocating for African-American history and culture in Savannah. He established the Savannah-Yamacraw Branch of the Association for the Study of Afro-American Life and History, the Ralph Mark Gilbert Civil Rights Museum, the King-Tisdell Cottage Museum, the Beach Institute of African American Culture, and the Negro Heritage Trail Tour.

== Background ==
Westley Wallace Law was born on January 1, 1923, in Savannah, Georgia. He was the only son and eldest of ten children born to Geneva Wallace and Westley Law. He began working at the age of ten to help his sick mother while attending school. In high school, Law entered the NAACP Youth Council and later served as the council's president while in college at Georgia State College (now Savannah State University). His college career was interrupted when he was drafted into military service in World War II. W. W. Law got back from the war and, with the help of the GI Bill, got back into college where he earned a bachelor's degree in biology.

After graduation Law worked as a mail carrier for the U.S. Postal Service for more than 40 years. His job at the Postal Service was endangered, however, when he was fired for his civil rights activism. President John F. Kennedy and the NAACP stepped in upon hearing of Law's firing and Law was reinstated in his job. Law retired from the Postal Service in 1990. He died on July 29, 2002, at his house in Savannah, Georgia.

== Sources ==
- New Georgia Encyclopedia W. W. Law
- The Ralph Mark Gilbert Civil Rights Museum
- George A. Sgouros/Portrait Photographer (W. W. Law - 1997) with Fine Art Portrait Photographer & Chronicler Maria von Matthiessen
