= Ralph Mark Gilbert =

- Born: March 17, 1899; Jacksonville, Florida, U.S.
- Died: August 23, 1956 (aged 57); Manhattan, New York, U.S.
- Organization: NAACP
- Movement: National Association for the Advancement of Colored People (NAACP) lead American Civil Rights Movement (1955-1968), American Civil Rights Movement
- Spouse: Eloria Sherman Gilbert (1945 - 1956)

Ralph Mark Gilbert (March 17, 1899 – August 23, 1956) was an American civil rights leader and a Baptist minister.

== Religious ministry ==
From 1939 until his death in 1956, he was the Pastor of the First African Baptist Church, located at 23 Montgomery Street on Franklin Square in Savannah's Historic District.

== Civil Rights ==
From 1942 to 1950, Gilbert served as president of the Savannah Branch of the National Association for the Advancement of Colored People (NAACP). Under his tenure, the local chapter was reorganized, hundreds of Blacks were registered to vote, a progressive white Democratic politician, John G. Kennedy, became Mayor of Savannah and the city's Police Department hired its first Black police officers, known as the Original Nine.

== Death ==
Reverend Gilbert died on August 23, 1956, while on vacation in New York City.

== Honors ==
Savannah's Ralph Mark Gilbert Civil Rights Museum is named in honor of Dr. Gilbert. The museum is located at 460 Martin Luther King Jr. Blvd. in the Wage Earners Bank building constructed in 1914. Renovation of the building began in 1993 to house the museum and opened as Ralph Mark Gilbert Civil Rights Museum in 1996.
