= WBMQ (Savannah, Georgia) =

Radio station in Savannah, Georgia, United States (1939–2020)

Coordinates: 32°4′31.7″N 81°4′16.4″W

- Savannah, Georgia; United States
- Broadcast area: Savannah metropolitan area
- Frequency: 630 kHz
- Branding: News-Talk 630 WBMQ

Programming
- Format: News/talk
- Affiliations: Westwood One News; WSAV-TV

Ownership
- Owner: Cumulus Media; (Cumulus Licensing LLC)
- Sister stations: WEAS-FM; WIXV; WJCL-FM; WJLG

History
- First air date: December 29, 1939 (as 1310 WSAV)
- Last air date: July 2020
- Former call signs: WSAV (1939–1977); WKBX (1977–1985)
- Former frequencies: 1340 kHz (1941–1949); 1310 kHz (1939–1941)

Technical information
- Facility ID: 54800
- Class: D
- Power: 4,800 watts (day); 47 watts (night)

WBMQ (630 kHz) was a commercial AM radio station in Savannah, Georgia. It was owned by Cumulus Media and aired a news/talk format. The studios and offices were on Television Circle in Savannah. The transmitter was off Dulany Avenue near the Savannah River.

WBMQ's weekday schedule was made up of mostly syndicated conservative talk shows from the co-owned Westwood One Network. They included Michael Savage, Chris Plante, Mark Levin, Clark Howard, Phil Valentine, John Batchelor, Red Eye Radio and America in the Morning with John Trout. Most hours began with Westwood One News. NBC-TV network affiliate WSAV-TV supplied WBMQ with some local news and weather. (At one time, the two stations had been co-owned.)

== History ==
=== Early years as WSAV ===
On December 29, 1939, the station first signed on as WSAV, with the call sign standing for Savannah. It broadcast on 1310 kHz at a power of 100 watts. Studios and offices were in the Liberty National Bank Building. After the North American Regional Broadcasting Agreement (NARBA) took effect in 1941, the station moved to AM 1340. WSAV was an NBC Red Network affiliate, carrying its schedule of dramas, comedies, news, sports, soap operas, game shows and big band broadcasts during the Golden Age of Radio.

In 1947, an FM station was added, WSAV-FM 100.3. It mostly simulcast the AM station's programming, but management did not see much of a future for FM radio and was more interested in building a TV station. Because of this, WSAV-FM stopped broadcasting in the mid-1950s and the license was turned in.

=== Move to AM 630 ===
In 1949, WSAV moved to AM 630, coupled with a big boost in power. WSAV began running at 5,000 watts around the clock, non-directional by day but using a directional antenna at night to protect other stations on the frequency. WSAV used a three-tower antenna array on Oatland Island.

In 1956, WSAV put Savannah's second TV station on the air. WSAV had battled with rival radio station WJIV for the last VHF TV license available in Savannah. (WTOC-TV had gone on the air two years earlier.) WSAV emerged the winner. WSAV-TV (channel 3) became an NBC-TV affiliate, since WSAV was an NBC Radio affiliate.

=== Sale to Beasley ===
In 1977, management decided to sell WSAV radio, while retaining WSAV-TV. WSAV was sold to Beasley Broadcasting. Because two stations that were no longer co-owned could not share the same call letters, AM 630 became WKBX. Beasley teamed up the station with FM station WSGF, which it also owned. WKBX's full service middle of the road format was continued for several years. But in 1981, the station switched to a Christian radio format. In 1983, WKBX began airing country music. It changed to WBMQ in 1985 and began playing oldies.

WBMQ and WSGF were bought by Radio Southeast in 1988. Radio Southeast changed WBMQ's format to talk in 1990. The station featured local hosts and at night carried syndicated shows from NBC Talknet. World and national news was supplied by CBS Radio News.

=== Sale to Cumulus ===
In 1998, Cumulus Media bought WBMQ and its FM sister station, WIXV (the former WSGF). Cumulus also acquired WEAS-FM, WJCL-FM, WJLG (the former WJIV) and WZAT, creating a six-station cluster. All of the stations were moved to studios on Television Circle in Savannah.

In the early 2010s, WBMQ gave up its transmitter site on Oatland Island, and moved to a new location in Savannah, near the Savannah River. Because it was now using a single non-directional tower, it had to reduce its output. Daytime power dropped slightly to 4,800 watts, and nighttime power was reduced significantly to 47 watts. While the daytime signal covered a large region of Coastal Georgia and South Carolina, the nighttime signal only served Savannah and its adjacent communities.

WBMQ's transmitter was damaged by a lightning storm in July 2020, taking the station silent; WJLG, which operated from the same site, would remain on the air at reduced power. On October 9, Cumulus elected to return both stations' licenses to the Federal Communications Commission (FCC) instead of making repairs; the surrender also invalidated a construction permit for an FM translator station, W245DD (96.9), to relay WBMQ. WBMQ's license was cancelled on October 13, 2020.
