= WJLG =

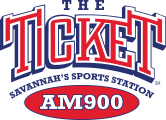
- Savannah, Georgia; United States
- Broadcast area: Savannah, Georgia
- Frequency: 900 kHz
- Branding: AM 900 The Ticket

Programming
- Format: Defunct (was Sports)
- Affiliations: Fox Sports Radio; Premiere Radio Networks

Ownership
- Owner: Cumulus Media; (Cumulus Licensing LLC)
- Sister stations: WBMQ, WEAS-FM, WIXV, WJCL-FM

History
- First air date: 1950; 76 years ago (as WJIV)
- Last air date: October 13, 2020; 5 years ago (for license) October 18, 2020; 5 years ago (for transmitter)
- Former call signs: WJIV (1950–1962); WEAS (1962-1983 and 1987-1998); WWJD (1983–1987) WJLG (1987–2020)

Technical information
- Facility ID: 71365
- Class: D
- Power: 4,350 watts day 152 watts night
- Transmitter coordinates: 32°4′29.00″N 81°4′17.00″W

WJLG (900 AM) was a radio station broadcasting a sports radio format. Licensed to Savannah, Georgia, United States, the station served the Savannah area. The station was last owned by Cumulus Media and featured programming from Fox Sports Radio and Premiere Radio Networks. Its studios were located on Television Circle in Savannah; its transmitter was located east of historic downtown at the interchange of President Street and Harry S. Truman Parkway.

== History ==
The station went on the air as WJIV in 1950 as an R&B station. Upon changing to a country music format, WJIV changed its call sign to WEAS in 1962, after co-owned WEAS in Decatur, Georgia took the new call WGUN. (Decatur is the home of two colleges, Emory and Agnes Scott, hence the WEAS call). At this time, the station operated with 5,000 watts daytime from a transmitter site on Hutchinson Island in the Savannah River. It changed call letters to WWJD on October 24, 1983, changed back to WEAS on June 28, 1987, then on October 26, 1998 — changed to WJLG.

WJIV was involved in a long-running battle with WSAV for a grant for television channel 3 in Savannah. It appeared that the Rivers' family political connections would have the license granted to WJIV, but, in the end, WSAV won out and became Savannah's second TV station (after WTOC-TV).

In 1961, the transmitting antenna was damaged in a storm and for several years resulted in a weak signal. A new tower, to also support the new WEAS-FM antenna, improved coverage. A relocation of the transmitter, site to allow for development of a hotel and golf course, caused the station to reduce power from 5,000 watts to 4,350 watts.

As WJLG, the transmitter was damaged by a lightning storm in July 2020, resulting in a temporary power reduction to 200 watts; sister station WBMQ (the former WSAV), which operated from the same site, was forced off the air entirely. On October 9, Cumulus elected to return both stations' licenses to the Federal Communications Commission (FCC) instead of making repairs; the surrender also invalidated a construction permit for an FM translator station, W289CL (105.7), to relay WJLG. The station licenses were cancelled on October 13, 2020.
