= WCHY (disambiguation) =

WCHY is a radio station (97.7 FM) licensed to Cheboygan, Michigan, United States

WCHY may also refer to:

- WMHX, a radio station (105.1 FM) licensed to Waunakee, Wisconsin, United States which held the call sign WCHY from 2005 to 2012
- WQBT, a radio station (94.1 FM) licensed to serve Savannah, Georgia, United States which held the call sign WCHY-FM from 1987 to 1999
- WTKS (AM), a radio station (1290 AM) licensed to serve Savannah, Georgia, United States which held the call sign WCHY from 1987 to 2002
