= WJCL =

WJCL could refer to:

- WJCL-FM, a radio station (96.5 FM) licensed to Savannah, Georgia, United States
- WJCL (TV), a television station (channel 22) licensed to Savannah, Georgia, United States
