= WKZV (FM) =

K-Love radio station in Tybee Island–Savannah, Georgia

Coordinates: 32.058°N 81.338°W

- Tybee Island, Georgia; United States
- Broadcast area: Savannah, Georgia; Hilton Head, South Carolina
- Frequency: 102.1 MHz

Programming
- Format: Contemporary Christian
- Network: K-Love

Ownership
- Owner: Educational Media Foundation

History
- First air date: October 20, 1971
- Former call signs: WZAT (1971–2019)
- Call sign meaning: K-Love and Savannah

Technical information
- Facility ID: 25549
- Class: C0
- ERP: 98,000 watts
- HAAT: 404.9 meters (1328 ft)

Links
- Webcast: Listen Live
- Website: klove.com

WKZV (102.1 MHz) is a non-commercial Christian FM radio station licensed to Tybee Island, Georgia. The station is owned by the Educational Media Foundation, and serves the Savannah metropolitan area. Its transmitter is located west of the city in unincorporated Chatham County.

== History ==
On October 20, 1971, WZAT signed on. It was a completely automated Top 40/CHR station except for the locally popular "Breakfast With Burl" program, which was live. Airstaff was gradually added the rest of the day. Between a strong AM station, AM 1400 WSGA, and a slightly lighter top 40 station, FM 95.5 WSGF, a real format war ensued. By 1986, 95SGF had become AOR/CR outlet WIXV, and in 1982, AM 1400 moved out of the format as younger listeners preferred FM radio. In the 1980s to early-1990s, "Z102" was the dominant (and often only) Top 40 station in Savannah. Stations like 99.7 WHTK, Kiss 98.7, Wave 97, and Blu 92 all tried and (mostly) failed in taking on the popular Z102.

In August 1993, the station was sold and flipped to modern rock as "WZAT (or later, Z102) - Savannah's Rock and Roll Radio." Phoenix Media Partners sold the station to Cumulus in 1997. Upon the sale to Cumulus, the station repositioned as Top 40. The station has since been Top 40 and Top 40/Hot AC hybrid twice since then. It flipped to Hot AC on March 11, 2008. The next day, the station revealed its new name and positioner, which was "Mix 102-1 - The Best Mix of Music." On October 1, 2010 WZAT began stunting with sports highlights in preparation of a new format. On October 4, 2010, 102.1 became a sports talk station carrying ESPN Radio. On January 2, 2013, 102.1 switched to CBS Sports Radio, since Cumulus owns an interest in the network.

On August 15, 2014, WZAT flipped to a country music format branded as Nash Icon 102.1. As part of the company's Nash FM brand, the Nash Icon format is designed to be a slightly older country sound, with an emphasis on music by veteran country acts alongside newer hit songs. WZAT was, along with co-owned W255CJ Atlanta, one of the first two stations to adopt the format.

Former "Sound" logo (2017–2019)

On March 24, 2017, after stunting with songs with the word "sound" in their names, WZAT returned to Hot AC as "102.1 The Sound". Positioning itself between WAEV and WYKZ, the move brings the frequency close to its longtime heritage as Z102. The syndicated "Bert Show" was added for morning & "The Adam Bomb Show" for afternoons drive time.

On February 13, 2019, Cumulus Media announced it would sell six stations, including WZAT, to the Educational Media Foundation for $103.5 million. Following the consummation of the sale on May 31, 2019, the station flipped to their K-Love network. With the change, WZAT changed its call letters to WKZV on June 5, 2019.

== Former logo ==
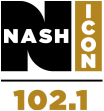
