= WSAV =

WSAV may refer to:

- WSAV-TV, a television station (channel 16, virtual 3) licensed to serve Savannah, Georgia, United States
- WSAV-LP, a low-power radio station (93.7 FM) licensed to serve Lorain, Ohio, United States
- WBMQ (Savannah, Georgia), a radio station (630 AM) licensed to serve Savannah, Georgia, which held the call sign WSAV from 1939 to 1977
