= Julius Curtis Lewis Jr. =

American businessman and politician

Julius Lewis Jr.
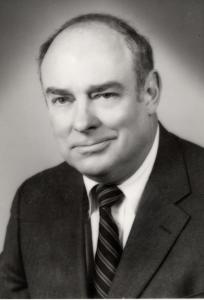

60th Mayor of Savannah, Georgia
- In office October 3, 1966 – October 3, 1970
- Preceded by: Malcolm R. Maclean
- Succeeded by: John Rousakis

Personal details
- Born: March 11, 1926 Savannah, Georgia, U.S.
- Died: August 20, 2005 (aged 79) Savannah, Georgia, U.S.
- Party: Republican
- Education: University of Georgia
- Profession: Businessman

Julius Curtis Lewis Jr. (March 11, 1926 – August 20, 2005), was an American businessman, philanthropist and Chairman of J.C. Lewis Enterprises, Lewis Broadcasting Corporation, J.C. Lewis Investment Company, and Island Investments. He served one term as Mayor of Savannah in the late 1960s as a Republican.

From the 1940s to 2005, Lewis developed a sizable business empire, including automobile dealerships and media outlets throughout the southeast, including both a TV and radio station bearing his initials—WJCL-TV (the Savannah, Georgia market's first all-color television station), and WJCL-FM (the market's first stereo FM station), and acquired numerous commercial real estate properties including shopping centers and tracts of mixed-use properties throughout the Savannah area. Lewis owned a portion of land on the southern end of Skidaway Island and later developed much of it into Moon River Landing, the final phase of the Landings on Skidaway Island and Green Island, a barrier island located off the coast of Georgia.

== History ==
=== Early life and career ===
A native of Savannah, J.C. Lewis Jr. was a prefect at the Woodberry Forest School in Orange, Virginia, where he graduated with honors and went on to graduate summa cum laude (highest honors) from the University of Georgia. Lewis was a veteran of the United States Navy, the Coast Guard, and the Merchant Marine.

Lewis then embarked on what would become an incredibly successful business career, building wealth and stature in several arenas, but perhaps most so in the fields of automotive sales, television broadcasting, and real estate. In 1929 the general aviation committee of the Savannah City Council purchased 730 acres (3 km^{2}), the Belmont Tract belonging to Mr. Lewis' father, J.C. Lewis, as the future site of the Savannah Municipal Airport now known as Hunter Army Airfield.

Lewis started his life by inheriting Georgia's oldest Ford dealership from his father and built a diversified family empire. He "proved to be a brilliant businessman, opening additional Ford dealerships in Daytona Beach and Melbourne, Fla., adding new brands to his Savannah dealership, and investing in tractor sales, taxi cab businesses, television and radio stations, hotels, life insurance, yacht sales and real estate." .

His business interests included numerous television and radio stations, along with new and used car dealerships throughout the southeast; and over a dozen other companies including life insurance, finance corporations, and both commercial and residential real estate development firms.

His automotive interests included two Ford dealerships in Savannah, Georgia (Georgia's oldest continuously operated Ford Dealership), as well as the city's Lincoln, Mercury, Mazda, Saab, and Avis Rent A Car franchises. He also owned the Ford dealerships in Daytona Beach and Melbourne, Florida. Lewis was a principal partner in CLV-Credit Life Insurance Corporation and owned Owens and Trojan Yacht Sales Group which was located at the JC Lewis Marina located in Thunderbolt, Georgia.

His media properties included: ABC-22 WJCL-TV and Fox-28 WTGS-TV in Savannah, Georgia, NBC-38 WLTZ-TV in Columbus, Georgia, CBS-19 WLTX-TV in Columbia, South Carolina, and a country western format radio station in Savannah, Georgia, WJCL-FM, as well as three classic rock–formatted stations in Jackson, WSTZ-FM, Vicksburg, Mississippi's WSTZ-AM, and Columbia, South Carolina's WNOK. In the mid-1970s Lewis acquired the Savannah Business Journal newspaper.

Lewis was instrumental in developing the southside of Savannah, along Abercorn Street and an adjacent area of the city presently known as Habersham Woods. Much of the latter was an outgrowth of his Oakdale tract. He also sold the land that facilitated the construction of Oglethorpe Mall and the subsequent surrounding retail areas.

=== Mayorship ===
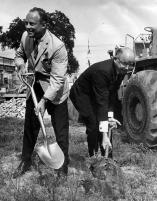
Mayor Lewis and Gov. Lester Maddox breaking ground on the Savannah Civic Center (1970)

In 1966 Lewis became the first Republican mayor of a Georgia city since Reconstruction. His entire slate of six Republican aldermanic candidates were elected to City Hall. Although he did not exploit the racial issues, he benefited from a backlash from white voters against the popular Democratic incumbent, Malcolm Maclean. Many white segregationists considered that Maclean had been too soft on matters of race. After four years in office, Lewis lost his last-minute reelection bid to Democratic nominee John Rousakis, who succeeded Lewis in 1970.

During his tenure at city hall, Lewis was directly responsible for the construction of the Savannah Civic Center (completed in 1974), the planning of the Harry S. Truman Parkway, and played a pivotal role in the revitalization of the city's River Street, eventually a popular tourist area. As mayor he also instituted the Model Cities Program, part of a national effort to erase neglect in blighted neighborhoods, and successfully led efforts to designate Wassaw Island, a large barrier island southeast of Savannah, a U.S. Wildlife Refuge in 1969. Construction of the city's sewerage treatment plant was also completed during his term.

In the early 1960s, Lewis, a former YMCA president, donated 8.5 acres (3.4 ha) of land on South Habersham Street and went on to lead the 1964 capital funds campaign. This eventually resulted in the YMCA Family Center on Habersham renamed in 2007, the YMCA J.C. Lewis Jr. Family Center – Habersham in Savannah. He subsequently donated the adjacent tract of land for the formation of Memorial Baptist Church and Memorial Day School. Lewis was the primary benefactor in the Grace House and the Magdalene and Phoenix Projects. While serving as Mayor in 1967, he was approached by then Sheriff Wilkes S. MacFeeley about establishing and operating a "One Hundred Club" to provide financial support to the families of law enforcement officers and firefighters killed in the line of duty. The club was established in 1968, with Lewis serving as the president until 1976.

=== Later years and death ===
In the 1970s and '80s Lewis owned and operated a group of hotels including the Howard Johnson's in Hardeeville, South Carolina, Savannah's Downtowner Motor Inn (which later became the Ramada Inn downtown Savannah), and the Ramada Inn in Melbourne, Florida. All three hotels were new concepts for their day, which Lewis constructed with a nod to his native Savannah: He strayed from the Downtowner corporate concept and added the locally inspired Savannah wrought-iron railings to fit the locale. The Savannah Ramada Inn was later sold to Savannah College of Art and Design in 1987 and converted into the school's first dormitory, enabling much of the school's subsequent growth. The adjacent property on Oglethorpe Avenue still bearing the original J.C. Lewis signage, the site of second J.C. Lewis Motor Company location, was also sold to SCAD to become the school's gymnasium, ClubSCAD.

Lewis died at Candler Hospital in Savannah on August 6, 2005, at age 79. He suffered from leukemia for several years. He had remained active in the community, serving as a director on numerous civic and business boards throughout the southeast up until his death.

== Private life and philanthropy ==
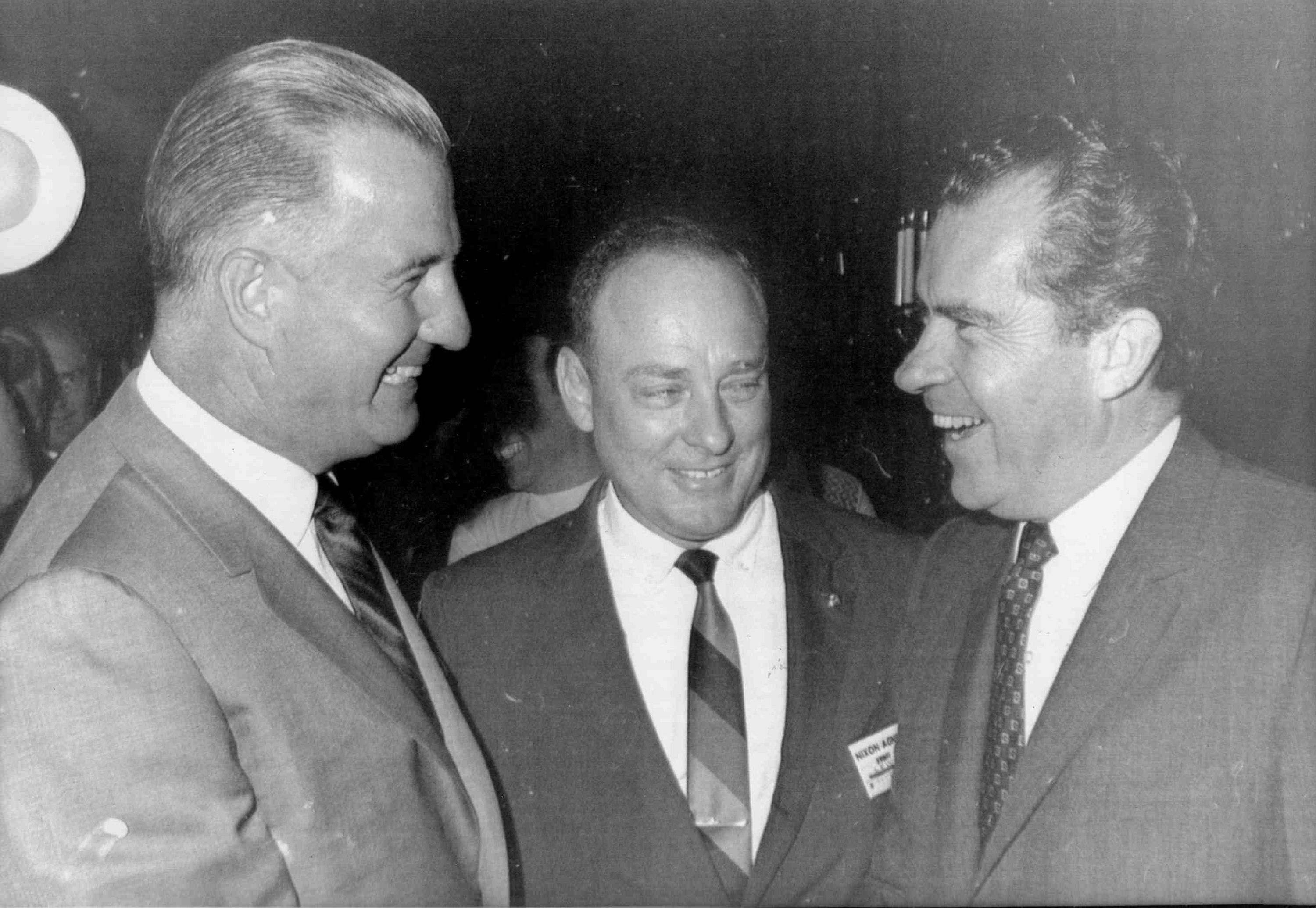
1968: Lewis meets with presidential nominee Richard Nixon and Nixon's running mate, Governor Spiro Agnew, at the Bahia Hotel, San Diego

Lewis married Nancy Nelson and together they had six children and 11 grandchildren. He was an avid yachtsman, amateur radio operator (FCC EXTRA Class), family man, and Sunday School teacher (church deacon). The businessman and former mayor was one of Georgia's leading figures in the 20th century and one of the South's most generous philanthropists.

In a local TV interview with WTOC-TV that aired just after Lewis' 2005 funeral, then-Savannah Mayor Otis Johnson stated that "Curtis Lewis was Savannah's most generous philanthropist. The question is who is going to pick up where he left off." That same day then Georgia District 1 Congressman (Where Savannah is located in) Jack Kingston offered a similar sentiment on Lewis' beneficence to the hostess city, stating: "Not since James Oglethorpe has someone done for Savannah what Mr. J.C. Lewis, Jr. did in his lifetime."

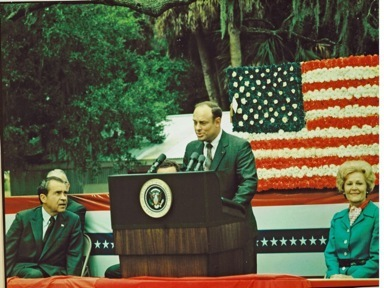
Lewis speaks at the presidential podium in 1970 at the dedication of the Skidaway Island, Oceanographic Institute (L to R, President Richard Nixon, Lewis and First Lady Pat Nixon)

Lewis is remembered as a very generous man who was never too busy to listen to others' needs. His 501c3 family foundation, established in 1953, is the largest family foundation in terms of assets in Chatham County, the largest county in population in the state of Georgia outside of metro Atlanta. Lewis was the primary benefactor of numerous organizations and charitable groups throughout the Southeast over the years, with a particular focus on the Savannah area. He donated millions of dollars in cash to various organizations, often without public recognition. These donations included more than $5 million to the Union Mission (August 23, 2005, Savannah Morning News), which provides shelter for men, women, and families, as well as short- and long-term housing assistance, health and dental care, behavioral counseling, substance abuse programs, life-skills training, and job training and employment assistance for the low-income population of the Coastal Empire.

Lewis also supported the First Baptist Church of Savannah on Chippewa Square, where he was a member for 66 years. Its campus includes the Lewis Fellowship Hall and the Mahogany Altar. He also donated the land and buildings for Skidaway Island Baptist Church, the Savannah Baptist Center, the J.C. Lewis Primary Health Center, the J.C. Lewis Dental Center, and the J.C. Lewis Promotion Center. The Primary Health Center became a national model for healthcare for the indigent, helping hospitals save millions of dollars annually in uncompensated care costs. His contributions also helped establish the freestanding J.C. Lewis Primary Health Care Pediatric Center on Waters Avenue, the J.C. Lewis Behavioral Health Center, and the Chatham County Republican Party headquarters on Abercorn Street.

Lewis also donated the land for numerous other nonprofit groups throughout the Savannah area including the Congregation Agudath Achim and the B'nai B'rith Jacob Synagogue's apartment complex, The Episcopal Church of Oakdale, Georgia, The Skidaway Island Community Center, Virginia Heard Public School, New Hope African Baptist Church of Savannah, The Word of God building & (Alzheimer's Association Coastal Georgia Region), and a portion of the land for The Savannah Jewish Educational Alliance (JEA) as well as a portion of the land for the Jepson Center for the Arts of the Telfair Museum of the Arts in downtown Savannah which houses the J.C. and Nancy Lewis Gallery on its top floor featuring rotating exhibits throughout the year.

Lewis was also a major benefactor of the Savannah Country Day School's Lewis Leadership Center and Savannah Christian Preparatory School's Nancy N Lewis and JC Lewis Fine Arts Hall as well as the 50 million dollar Nancy N. and J.C. Lewis Cancer and Research Pavilion at St. Josephs / Candler Hospital System; the 62,000 sq ft cancer center is the Savannah region's only National Cancer Institute selected facility. Lewis endowed over one million dollars in 2003 to the JC and Nancy Lewis Christian Missions Endowment Fund of Woodberry Forest School in Orange, Virginia.

Lewis established the German Heritage society's scholarship fund with members of the Society contributing to further the education of German students in the United States and American students in Germany.

== Honors ==
A member of Alpha Tau Omega fraternity. Active on the Board of the Kiwanis Club; on the Bethesda Orphanage, on the board of directors; the Georgia Baptist Children's Home; Woodberry Forest School Board of Trustees; the President of the YMCA of the Coastal Empire; the Savannah Area Chamber of Commerce board of directors; the United Community Appeal or United Way; The Savannah Country Day School, Chairman Board of Trustees; Citizens and Southern Bank or Bank of America, board of directors; Savannah Foods (Imperial Sugar), board of directors; Association of the United States Army, President, Coastal Empire Chapter; the Benevolent and Protective Order of Elks, Savannah, GA Lodge 183; American Legion, Post 184; the United States Navy League; and The Salvation Army as well as The Mighty Eighth Air Force Museum Foundation as an Honorary Director. In 1957 he served as Chairman of the Georgia Automobile Dealers Association; and many more.

His awards have included a Brotherhood Award from Agudath Achim Synagogue, the President's Award from Savannah State College, Outstanding Alumni Award from the University of Georgia; Union Mission, Golden Heart Award; Community Service Award from the Georgia Municipal Association; United States Army Award for patriotic civilian service while serving as President of the Association of the United States Army, Coastal Empire Chapter; Salvation Army, "Others" Award; Savannah Exchange Club, Golden Deeds Award; the Rotary Club, Paul Harris Fellow and Honorary Member; The Oglethorpe Leadership Award by The Savannah Area Chamber of Commerce; a two-time recipient of The Ben Franklin Quality Dealer Award sponsored by The Saturday Evening Post magazine now sponsored by TIME Magazine; and also an inductee in the U.S. Business Hall of Fame by Junior Achievement.

The local Chatham County Republican Party named its annual award in his honor, the J.C. Lewis Lifetime Achievement Award.

In 2005, the 62,000 sq ft freestanding cancer treatment & research center of St. Joseph's/Candler Hospital was renamed to honor Lewis. St. Josephs/Candler Press Release.

In 2003, S. 1671, a White House Archives bill was passed to designate the facility of the United States Postal Serviceat 10701 Abercorn Street in Savannah as the "J. C. Lewis Jr. Post Office Building".

J.C. Lewis Jr. was posthumously honored with other philanthropists in 2006 when the YMCA cited its major contributors.

== Footnotes ==
Political offices
Preceded by Malcolm Maclean, Democrat	Mayor of Savannah; 1966–1970	Succeeded by John Rousakis, Democrat
