= WSOK =

Radio station in Savannah, Georgia

- Savannah, Georgia; United States
- Broadcast area: Savannah metropolitan area
- Frequency: 1230 kHz
- Branding: 99.7 WSOK

Programming
- Format: Urban gospel
- Affiliations: Premiere Networks

Ownership
- Owner: iHeartMedia, Inc.; (iHM Licenses, LLC)
- Sister stations: WAEV, WLVH, WQBT, WTKS, WYKZ

History
- First air date: October 30, 1946
- Former call signs: WFRP (1946–1959)

Technical information
- Licensing authority: FCC
- Facility ID: 50406
- Class: C
- Power: 1,000 watts (unlimited)
- Transmitter coordinates: 32°4′20″N 81°4′35″W
- Translator: 99.7 W259DE (Savannah)

Links
- Public license information: Public file; LMS
- Webcast: Listen live (via iHeartRadio)
- Website: 1230wsok.iheart.com

WSOK (1230 AM) is a radio station licensed to Savannah, Georgia, United States, broadcasting an urban gospel format. The station is currently owned by iHeartMedia, Inc. Its studios are located in Garden City (with a Savannah address) and utilizes a transmitter located east of historic downtown Savannah. With the normal Guy wires this station is unusual in having a 61.9M tall Tubular mast rather than the traditional Lattice design. The station is also heard on translator W259DE (99.7 FM) and available online via iHeartRadio.

== History ==
=== WFRP ===
After applying in 1944, Frank R. Pidcock and James M. Wilder were granted a construction permit for 1230 AM in Savannah in 1946, which took the call letters WFRP. The station opened on October 30, 1946. It was Savannah's only independent (non-network) station, though in the early 1950s it was the local outlet for the short-lived Liberty Broadcasting System, and in 1952 it picked up the ABC affiliation.

=== WSOK ===
In 1958, Albert Fisher, who had previously owned stations in Charleston and Columbia, South Carolina, bought WFRP from the Georgia Broadcasting Company for $87,500. Fisher changed the station's call letters to WSOK on January 5, 1959. As the sale concluded, an application was filed to increase WSOK's daytime power to 1,000 watts, which was granted in November 1961. By this time, the station had been sold again to Joe Speidel for $221,000. The callsign change and new ownership turned WSOK into a soul-formatted radio station, even though WSOK's owner was white; in 1970, a Race Relations Information Center noted that five white-owned groups (including Speidel) owned 22 soul stations, at which African Americans held 34 of the 84 executive positions. Many of them, however, were in name only; for instance, WSOK disc jockey Charles Anthony was also the program director, news director and public affairs director.

In 1971, WSOK was sold to B. C. C. Georgia, Inc., known as Black Communications Group, for $400,000. Ben Tucker owned 40 percent of the company, while jazz pianist Billy Taylor owned another 10 percent. A concerted effort was made to pull WSOK out of the trap that befell many white-owned soul outlets. While not the musical director, Taylor helped steer the format at WSOK away from its prior heavy focus on chart music: according to him, "Most black stations are owned by white owners. They think they know what is best for us, and they're chart-oriented." Tucker expanded the station's album collection from 20 to 4,000 selections; in addition, the station began offering Mutual Black Network news and increased its commitment to local news and public affairs programming. The improvements at WSOK, the 15th black-owned radio station in the United States, had raised it to number one in the local ratings within nine months of Black Communications Group taking over and led to a tenfold increase in the number of advertisers on the station.

After more than a decade of ownership, Black Communications Group sold the station to Bay Communications of Biloxi, Mississippi, in 1984. The $375,000 sale made it a sister to WAEV, creating the city's only AM-FM duopoly; Tucker remained on as a consultant. Love Broadcasting's radio division was acquired by the Opus Communications Group in 1989 for $11 million. In turn, Opus sold WAEV and WSOK to Southern Broadcasting for $2.35 million in 1995, Patterson Broadcasting acquired the stations plus WLVH for $11 million in 1996, and the entire 36-station Patterson portfolio was sold to Capstar—the forerunner of today's iHeartMedia—in a $215 million sale in 1997.

WSOK's tradition of public affairs programming remained strong. Despite being an AM outlet, it was the number two radio station in Savannah in 1995 and ranked fifth in the market in billing, which station management attributed to its higher-than-normal talk output. Among the talk shows from 1978 to 1994 was one hosted by future Savannah mayor Otis Johnson, titled "Message from the Grass Roots", which aired on Sunday afternoons. WSOK maintained its ratings position in 1998 despite the market having five urban stations. However, Clear Channel came under fire in 2004 for axing most of the station's live talk programming while not doing the same to sister WTKS, with a primarily white audience.

WSOK first began broadcasting on an FM translator in 2015, on W278BO at 103.5 FM. This translator was leased by iHeart from the Educational Media Foundation and was replaced in 2019 by newly licensed translator W259DE (99.7 FM).

== FM translator ==
Call sign	Frequency	City of license	FID	ERP (W)	HAAT	Class	Transmitter coordinates	FCC info
W259DE	99.7 FM	Savannah, Georgia	200505	180	141 m (463 ft)	D	32°3′26.6″N 81°8′46.7″W	LMS
