= WAEV =

Radio station in Savannah, Georgia, United States

Coordinates: 32.046028°N 81.340667°W

- Savannah, Georgia; United States
- Broadcast area: Savannah metropolitan area; Hilton Head
- Frequency: 97.3 MHz
- Branding: 97.3 Kiss FM

Programming
- Format: Contemporary hits
- Affiliations: Premiere Networks; Westwood One

Ownership
- Owner: iHeartMedia, Inc.; (iHM Licenses, LLC)
- Sister stations: WLVH, WQBT, WSOK, WTKS, WYKZ

History
- First air date: February 4, 1969
- Former call signs: WXLM (1969–1980)
- Call sign meaning: Former "wave" branding

Technical information
- Licensing authority: FCC
- Facility ID: 50403
- Class: C0
- ERP: 100,000 watts
- HAAT: 396 meters (1,299 ft)

Links
- Public license information: Public file; LMS
- Webcast: Listen live (via iHeartRadio)
- Website: 973kissfm.iheart.com

WAEV (97.3 FM, "97.3 Kiss FM") is a commercial radio station licensed to Savannah, Georgia, United States. Owned by iHeartMedia, it broadcasts a contemporary hits format using the "KISS-FM" brand. The studios and offices are on Alfred Street in Garden City, using a Savannah address.

WAEV's transmitter is sited on Fort Argyle Road (Georgia SR 204) near Bloomingdale, Georgia.

== History ==
The station signed on the air on February 4, 1969. The original call sign was WXLM. It played an easy listening format, a mix of instrumental cover versions of popular hits along with soft vocals. It was largely automated. WXLM was a rare stand-alone FM station, with no co-ownership with an AM station, television station or newspaper.

In September 1977, the station flipped to Album Rock in response to rival station WTOC starting a highly successful overnight album rock program in 1976. Before this, Savannah had been without a rock station since WEAS-FM flipped in the early 1970s. WXLM 97.3 went by the name "97 Rock." The station played long sets of rock music, including The Beatles, The Rolling Stones, Creedence Clearwater Revival and The Who.

In 1980, the station flipped to adult contemporary music, calling itself "Wave 97". It took new call letters, WAEV. When "WXLM 97 Rock" left the air, Savannah did not have a rock station until WIXV picked up the format in 1986. WAEV picked up the tempo and evolved into a hot adult contemporary station as "Mix 97.3" in 1993.

After several years of falling ratings and revenue in the early 2000s, the station rebranded to a Top 40—Contemporary Hits sound. It began using the KISS-FM branding in December 2001, common on other Clear Channel Communications FM stations such as KIIS-FM Los Angeles and KHKS Dallas. It picked up The Kidd Kraddick Morning Show from KHKS for its wake up program. After several months of further format "tweaking", the station moved into a mainstream mix of Top 40 hits.
