= NBC 22 =

NBC 22 may refer to one of the following television stations in the United States:

== Current ==
- WLWK-CD in Sturgeon Bay, Wisconsin
  - Translator of WGBA-TV in Green Bay, Wisconsin
- WWLP in Springfield, Massachusetts

== Former ==
- KFSA-TV (now KFSM-TV on channel 5) in Fort Smith, Arkansas (1953 to 1958)
- WJCL in Savannah, Georgia (1982 to 1985)
- WKEF in Dayton, Ohio (1980 to 2004)
