= WSAV-TV =

Television station in Savannah, Georgia, United States

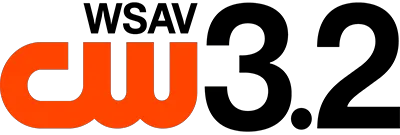
- Savannah, Georgia; United States
- City: Savannah, Georgia
- Channels: Digital: 16 (UHF); Virtual: 3
- Branding: WSAV-TV 3; WSAV News 3; WSAV CW 3.2

Programming
- Affiliations: 3.1: NBC; 3.2: CW+; for others, see § Subchannels

Ownership
- Owner: Nexstar Media Group; (Nexstar Media Inc.)

History
- Founded: February 1, 1956
- Former channel numbers: Analog: 3 (VHF, 1956–2009); Digital: 39 (UHF, 2000–2018)
- Former affiliations: ABC (1982–1985; secondary 1956–1970)
- Call sign meaning: Savannah; IATA code for Savannah/Hilton Head International Airport

Technical information
- Licensing authority: FCC
- Facility ID: 48662
- ERP: 800 kW
- HAAT: 442.4 m (1,451 ft)
- Transmitter coordinates: 32°3′31.7″N 81°17′54.4″W

Links
- Public license information: Public file; LMS
- Website: www.wsav.com

WSAV-TV (channel 3) is a television station in Savannah, Georgia, United States, affiliated with NBC and The CW Plus. Owned by Nexstar Media Group, the station maintains studios on East Victory Drive/US 80/SR 26 in Savannah's Live Oak section, and its transmitter is located on Little Neck Road in unincorporated northwestern Chatham County, near Pooler.

== History ==
The station began broadcasting on VHF channel 3 on February 1, 1956, and was co-owned with WSAV radio (630 AM; later WBMQ) after a long legal battle over the frequency with the owners of WJIV (900 AM). It initially aired an analog signal from a transmitter on top of a bank building on Broughton Street in Downtown Savannah. The flashing WSAV sign was a landmark on the street for many years. WSAV radio had long carried NBC Radio programming, so WSAV-TV took the NBC television affiliation.

It shared ABC with CBS affiliate WTOC-TV (channel 11) until 1970, when WJCL-TV (channel 22) started operations as a full-time ABC affiliate. During the late 1950s, WSAV-TV was also briefly affiliated with the NTA Film Network. WSAV briefly had an FM station using an antenna atop the middle of three AM towers at the transmitter facility on Oatland Island. However, without many listeners to the simulcast programming, the FM operation was ended in the 1950s.

In 1960, WSAV-AM-TV moved into a brand-new facility on Victory Drive, where WSAV-TV is still located today. A new tower was built at the site boosting its signal to many of the surrounding counties in Georgia and South Carolina. The current tower near Pooler was built in 1976. In the same year, the WSAV stations were sold to different parties, with WSAV-TV going to the News-Press & Gazette Company. In 1982, the station swapped affiliations with WJCL and became an ABC affiliate. That network had become number one in the country and was searching for stronger affiliates. However, by 1985, WSAV was one of several ABC affiliates nationwide that were disappointed with the network's weak prime time programming offerings, particularly on Thursday nights, which were bogging down WSAV's otherwise successful lineup. Meanwhile, WSAV returned to NBC a mere three years later in 1985, one year before that network became number one again, reversing the 1982 affiliation swap.

In the 1990s, like many other commercial television stations in the United States, WSAV was sold several times. NPG sold its entire broadcasting group of the time to the first incarnation of New Vision Television in 1993. Ellis Communications bought the New Vision stations in 1995.

In 1996, Ellis was sold to Retirement Systems of Alabama who merged it with Aflac's former broadcasting division to form Raycom Media. Since Aflac had owned rival WTOC, Raycom could not keep both stations due to Federal Communications Commission (FCC) regulations at the time forbidding common ownership of two stations in the same market; this rule would be partially repealed in 2000 when the FCC allowed common ownership of two stations in the same market provided that both of them are not the four highest-rated stations in a market with eight unique station owners. Savannah had only six full power stations at the time of the merger, which was too few to permit a duopoly in any case. As a result, Raycom opted to keep the higher-rated WTOC and sell WSAV. In early 1997, Raycom traded WSAV and two other stations to Media General in return for WTVR-TV in Richmond, Virginia.

In the 2000s, WSAV acquired the local rights to the syndicated game shows Wheel of Fortune and Jeopardy!. Both were previously shown on rival WJCL for almost two decades. On February 1, 2006, WSAV celebrated its 50th anniversary. To commemorate the event, Savannah Mayor Otis Johnson officially announced the date as "WSAV Day" and lauded the station for its many achievements over the decades. Its continued service to its viewers being always "On Your Side" whenever a viewer needs to get a story out was also recognized.

On March 21, 2014, LIN Media entered into an agreement to merge with Media General in a $1.6 billion deal. Because LIN already owned ABC affiliate WJCL and operated Fox affiliate WTGS (channel 28), the companies were required to sell either WSAV or WJCL and its SSA with WTGS to another station owner in order to comply with FCC ownership rules as well as planned changes to those rules regarding same-market television stations which would prohibit sharing agreements. On August 20, 2014, Media General announced that it would keep WSAV and sell WJCL to Hearst Television, with WTGS going to Sinclair Broadcast Group. The sale was completed on December 19, and Hearst closed on its purchase of WJCL and Birmingham-based WVTM-TV (the latter of which was acquired due to an ownership conflict with WIAT) three days later.

On January 27, 2016, Media General announced that it had entered into a definite agreement to be acquired by Nexstar Broadcasting Group for $4.6 billion. The combined company would be known as Nexstar Media Group, and own 171 stations (including WSAV-TV). The deal closed one year later, in January 2017.

== Weather with Captain Sandy ==
WSAV was known for an unusual practice on its newscasts from the 1950s to the 1970s. Channel 3 was home to "Captain Sandy", who was something of a hybrid between a weatherman and children's show host. The character gave the weather on the weeknight news working with puppet sidekicks "Wilbur the Weather Bird", "Arthur Mometer", and "Calamity Clam". Captain Sandy would appear on the news set wearing a vaguely nautical cap and blazer, as a nod to the region's dependence on the Atlantic Ocean. The comedy elements of the forecast included the thermometer and the clam. Captain Sandy's big thermometer was temperamental and would fidget before revealing the next day's high and low temperatures. When Captain Sandy opened Davy Jones' Locker to get the tide information (a crucial component of any weather forecast in the region) out of Calamity Clam, the puppeteer always tried to bite the captain's hand.

By the end of the 1970s, the new out-of-town owners of WSAV expressed embarrassment with Captain Sandy's routine as newscasts became more strait-laced and serious, with non-scientist weather anchors replaced with certified meteorologists trained in accurate forecasting. Most television stations around the country had begun to cancel local children's shows. NPG made the Captain finally conform to convention, putting him in a suit and tie like other newscasters, and getting rid of the puppets. One of the personalities behind the Captain Sandy character was smooth voiced Joe Cox, who later left WSAV to become weatherman at crosstown rival WJCL, where he also hosted an evening radio program on WJCL-FM 96.5. The original Captain Sandy from 1956 was played by Norm Strand.

== WSAV-DT2 ==
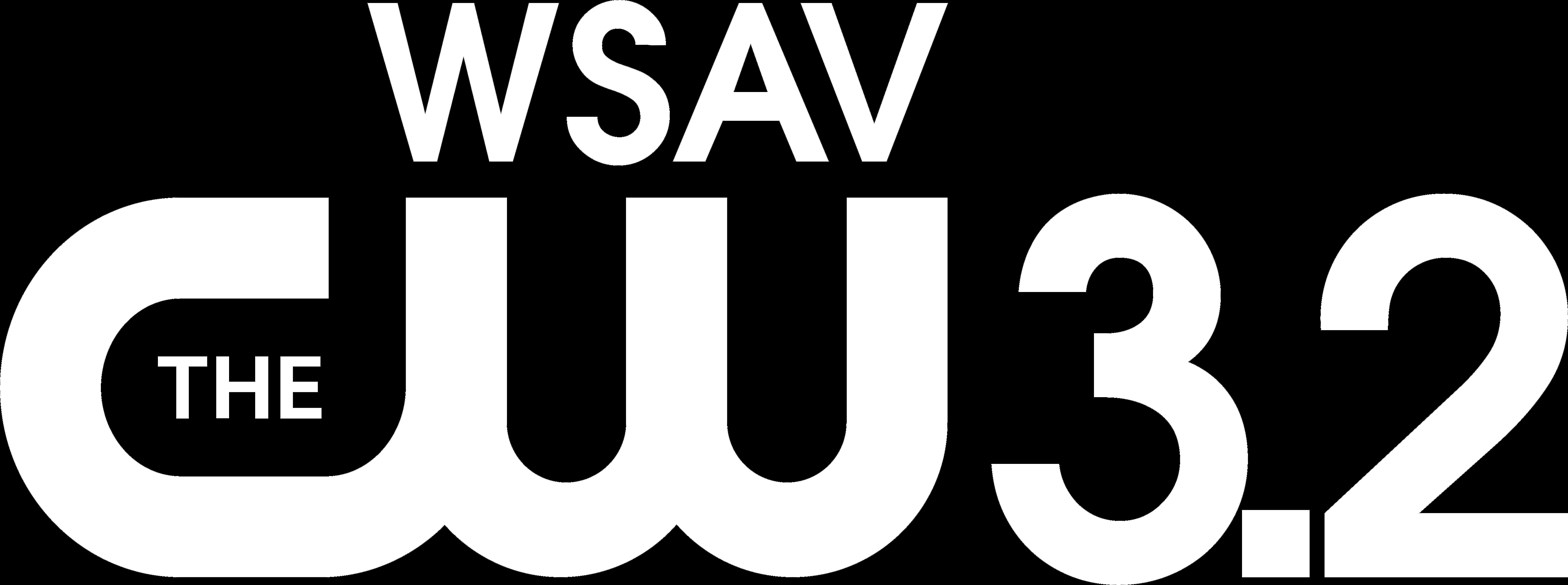
WSAV-DT2 logo on September 12, 2016

WSAV-DT2 is the CW+ owned-and-operated second digital subchannel of WSAV-TV, broadcasting in 720p high definition on channel 3.2.

=== History ===
What is now WSAV-DT2 began on September 21, 1998, after WSAV entered into a partnership with The WB 100+, a national programming service operated by The WB for television markets ranked greater than 100, and cable systems in the Savannah area. WSCG also carried The WB from the network's launch in January 1995 to 1997. After WSCG's switch to UPN and prior to the launch of The WB 100+, cable providers piped in WGN-TV's national feed and/or local WB affiliate WATL in Atlanta. It was a cable-exclusive station, and as a result, used the call sign "WBVH" (standing for "The WB Savannah") in a fictional manner for identification purposes. WSAV-TV provided local advertisement opportunities and performed promotional duties for the outlet.

On January 24, 2006, CBS Corporation (which split from Viacom after 2005) and Warner Bros. Television (the company which owned The WB) announced they then would cease operating the UPN and The WB networks and combine their resources to create a programming service entitled The CW. The letters would represent the first initial of the new network's respective corporate parents.

On September 18 of that year, The CW officially launched nationwide at which point WGCW-LP started to simulcast "WBVH" and allowing non-cable subscribers access to the new network; WGCW-LP was, in turn, relayed over the second subchannel of WSCG, until becoming exclusive to WSCG-DT1/DT2 on May 2, 2012, when WGCW-LP had suddenly fallen silent (with the "WGCW" call letters remaining as a part of this CW+ affiliate's branding, although at that point a fictitious call sign that was no longer recognized by the FCC). With its over-their-air launch, "WBVH" began using WGCW as its official calls and became part of The CW Plus, a successor to The WB 100+.

On September 5, 2006, WSAV-DT2 signed on as a MyNetworkTV/Retro TV affiliate. It switched to MeTV on September 26, 2011.

On February 29, 2016, it was announced that WSAV-DT2 would assume the CW affiliation from WSCG-DT1/DT2 on September 12 of that year, thus shifting MyNetworkTV and MeTV to WSAV-DT3 (replacing the station's weather radar). Shortly thereafter, WSAV-TV added Laff as a new fourth digital subchannel. After the move of MeTV to WJCL-DT2 in the fall of 2019, the third subchannel was replaced with Court TV, and MyNetworkTV's schedule was shifted onto WSAV-DT2 to overlay the national late night paid programming carried as part of The CW Plus schedule. As of March 16, 2021, MyNetworkTV programming has moved to WSAV-DT3, replacing Court TV programming weeknights from 9 to 11 p.m. WSAV-DT2 currently carries the only local 10 p.m. newscast on a Savannah station.

== News operation ==
For most of its history, WSAV has been a solid, if distant, runner-up to longtime dominant WTOC. While WSAV and WJCL made a serious threat in the 1970s, WTOC has won every timeslot since 1980 often garnering more viewers than its rivals combined. The CBS outlet airs more than seven hours of news a day, a considerable amount for a station in the 97th market and far more than any other television station in Savannah. In 1976, as part of a major expansion of its news department, WSAV moved to a former insurance office that is next door to its original East Victory Drive studios.

Until 2024, unlike most NBC affiliates in the Eastern Time Zone, WSAV did not offer midday newscasts during the week. The station now produces a half-hour midday newscast at 11 a.m. followed by the lifestyle/advertorial show The Bridge at 11:30 a.m. Another recent addition to local news on this outlet occurred on June 21, 2010, when it added a broadcast weeknights at 5:30. As well, WSAV recently added a 5 p.m. newscast to the lineup. Before this point in time, WTOC had been the area's only station to air local news in those time slots.

In 2009, WSAV-DT2 launched a two-person bureau to produce a newscast weeknights at 7 called My Lowcountry News, this production is specifically targeted to the South Carolina side of the market featuring coverage from throughout the Lowcountry and the state. Some stories originated from Media General's three stations in South Carolina.

There is a weather forecast targeted towards Hilton Head and Beaufort in addition to South Carolina sports headlines.

WSAV does maintain a bureau on Assembly Street/SC 48 covering the Capitol in Columbia. The operating expenses are shared among Nexstar's television stations in South Carolina. WSAV became the last Savannah station to upgrade newscasts to high definition level on March 8, 2011. However, since WSAV-DT3 only transmits in standard definition digital, My Lowcountry 3 was not included in the change. After switching to MeTV, that broadcast was reduced to a half-hour. In early October 2013, the half-hour 7 p.m. newscast was moved to 10 p.m. (now called WSAV News 3 at 10:00), it remained a half-hour broadcast and was also shown on Savannah's CW 13 (WGSA).

=== Controversy ===
The station made national headlines after reporter Alex Bozarjian, who was reporting live on the Savannah Bridge Run, was slapped on her buttocks by a runner during the broadcast. Bozarjian, who kept her composure, later tweeted that the runner "violated, objectified, and embarrassed me. No woman should EVER have to put up with this at work or anywhere!!" The runner, later identified as Thomas Callaway, was banned from participating in future races. Callaway apologized in an interview to WSAV in which he stated, "I'm thankful for this opportunity to share my apology to her and to her family, her friends and her co-workers. It was an awful act and an awful mistake."

On December 9, 2019, Bozarjian filed a sexual battery report with the Savannah Police Department against Callaway.

=== Notable current on-air staff ===
- Tina Tyus-Shaw – anchor

== Technical information ==
=== Subchannels ===
The station's signal is multiplexed:

Subchannels of WSAV-TV
Subchannel	Res.	Short name	Programming
3.1	1080i	WSAV-HD	NBC
3.2	720p	WSAV-CW	The CW Plus
3.3	480i	CourtTV	Court TV (primary); MyNetworkTV (secondary)
3.4	480i	Laff	Laff

=== Analog-to-digital conversion ===
WSAV-TV ended regular programming on its analog signal, over VHF channel 3, on June 12, 2009, the official date on which full-power television stations in the United States transitioned from analog to digital broadcasts under federal mandate. The station's digital signal remained on its pre-transition UHF channel 39, using virtual channel 3.
