= WTYB =

- Bluffton, South Carolina; United States
- Broadcast area: Hilton Head - Savannah metropolitan area
- Frequency: 103.9 MHz
- Branding: Magic 103.9

Programming
- Format: Urban adult contemporary

Ownership
- Owner: Cumulus Media; (Cumulus Licensing, LLC)
- Sister stations: WEAS-FM, WIXV, WJCL-FM

History
- First air date: March 1978
- Former call signs: WGEC (1978–1995); WSGF (1995–1998); WSIS (1998–2004)
- Call sign meaning: Tybee Island (former location)

Technical information
- Facility ID: 14069
- Class: C2
- ERP: 50,000 watts
- HAAT: 105 meters (344 ft)
- Transmitter coordinates: 32°3′33″N 81°0′57″W

Links
- Webcast: Listen live
- Website: magic1039fm.com

WTYB (103.9 FM, "Magic 103.9") is a commercial radio station licensed to Bluffton, South Carolina, United States, serving Hilton Head and the Savannah metropolitan area. Owned by Cumulus Media, it carries an urban adult contemporary format, with studios on Television Circle in Savanah, and the transmitter situated off Riverview Road near the Islands Expressway in Whitemarsh Island, Georgia.

== Station history ==
The station was originally in Springfield, Georgia, with the call sign WGEC. It signed on the air in March 1978. This station first aired an urban adult contemporary music format from 1998-2003 as WSIS "Kiss 104" and then as "V103.9". Briefly in 2005, the station aired an Oldies format as "Cool 103.9."

Logo under previous slogan

The station later moved to Tybee Island. It was assigned the callsign WTYB by the Federal Communications Commission on July 9, 2004. After stunting with Christmas music and the greatest hits of Johnny Cash, the station debuted as "Magic 103.9" with an Urban AC format on January 8, 2006.

In November 2007, Cumulus attempted to transfer ownership of WTYB to a trustee, Stratus Radio LLC, with the intention of selling it to another owner in order to meet FCC ownership caps. That deal, however, ultimately fell through and Cumulus Licensing LLC retained the broadcast license.

In April 2011, after the Cumulus merger with Citadel Broadcasting, it was determined that WTYB would be one of several stations spun off to Volt Radio, LLC. The station was reclaimed from the trust effective April 28, 2016.
