= WTKS (AM) =

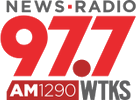
- Savannah, Georgia; United States
- Broadcast area: Savannah metropolitan area
- Frequency: 1290 kHz
- Branding: NewsRadio 97.7 and 1290 AM WTKS

Programming
- Format: Conservative talk
- Affiliations: Fox News Radio; Premiere Networks; WTOC-TV

Ownership
- Owner: iHeartMedia, Inc.; (iHM Licenses, LLC)
- Sister stations: WAEV; WLVH; WQBT; WSOK; WYKZ

History
- First air date: October 15, 1929
- Former call signs: WTOC (1929–1979); WWSA (1979–1987); WCHY (1987–2002)
- Call sign meaning: "Talks"

Technical information
- Licensing authority: FCC
- Facility ID: 8589
- Class: B
- Power: 5,300 watts (day); 5,000 watts (night)
- Transmitter coordinates: 32°5′21.7″N 81°8′45.4″W
- Translator: 97.7 W249BS (Savannah)

Links
- Public license information: Public file; LMS
- Webcast: Listen live (via iHeartRadio)
- Website: newsradio1290wtks.iheart.com

WTKS (1290 AM, "NewsRadio 97.7 and AM 1290") is a commercial radio station licensed to Savannah, Georgia, United States, and serving the Savannah metropolitan area. Owned by iHeartMedia, it features a conservative talk format, with studios and transmitter located in Garden City, Georgia (with a Savannah address). WTKS is also simulcast on low-power FM translator, W249BS (97.7 FM).

== History ==
=== Early years ===
The station signed on the air on October 15, 1929. Its call sign was WTOC and it was the first broadcasting station in the Savannah area. It was an enterprise of the civic group Junior Board of Trade that was the forerunner of the Savannah Jaycees. WTOC broadcast on 1260 kilocycles with 500 watts day and night, non-directional. Later, the power increased to 1,000 watts daytime, and later to 5,000 watts days and 1,000 watts at night. With the North American Regional Broadcasting Agreement (NARBA) nationwide frequency shift in 1941, the station moved to 1290 kHz. Shortly thereafter, a four tower array was built in Garden City, and power increased to 5,000 watts at night using a directional antenna.

WTOC ("Welcome To Our City"), was owned for many years by the Knight family, with William T. Knight serving as president of the Savannah Broadcasting Company. It was a CBS Radio Network affiliate, carrying its schedule of dramas, comedies, news, sports, soap operas, game shows and big band broadcasts during the Golden Age of Radio. One of its rivals, WSAV, was a network affiliate of NBC Radio.

WTOC added an FM station in 1946. It first broadcast at 97.3 MHz, later moving to 94.1 MHz (today WQBT). In 1954, WTOC-TV (channel 11) came on the air. Because WTOC radio was a longtime CBS affiliate, WTOC-TV also carried CBS TV programming and news.

=== Switch to MOR ===
As network programming shifted to television in the 1950s, WTOC became a full service middle of the road (MOR) music station. WTOC aired many features, both network and local, as well as having significant news programming. It was not until the mid-1970s that WTOC became much more contemporary with its programming. For a while, the station called its sound "The Love Rock," primarily playing what would today be called adult contemporary music. WTOC used TM's "Sound Of Chicago" jingle package, which had been created for WMAQ.

In the 1960s and early 1970s, WTOC-FM used BPI's beautiful music format. In the mid-1970s, it switched to BPI's country music format, and became "Country 94".

=== Great American Country ===
In 1979, the Knights sold WTOC radio and television to the American Family Life Assurance Company from Columbus, Georgia. American Family spun the radio stations off to Bluegrass Broadcasting of Lexington, Kentucky. Bluegrass built a large studio-office complex adjacent to the AM transmitter site on Alfred Street, and renamed the AM WWSA (Working With Savannah) and the FM became WCHY-FM. In 1987, the AM switched to the WCHY call letters. It flipped to classic country music, using the "Great American Country" syndicated service, while the FM continued with contemporary country.

WCHY (AM) and WCHY-FM were sold by Roth Broadcasting in 1995, to WP Radio. When WP Radio decided to leave broadcasting, it sold the stations to Patterson Broadcasting. In May 1998, WCHY switched to a children's/contemporary hit radio format, becoming the Radio Disney affiliate in Savannah.

former logo before simulcast on 97.7 FM

=== Talk radio format ===
In 2000, the station was acquired by Clear Channel Communications, a forerunner to current owner iHeartMedia. Clear Channel flipped the station's format to talk radio. The Federal Communications Commission assigned the station the WTKS call letters on January 25, 2002.

On March 28, 2011, Clear Channel purchased an FM translator for WTKS, allowing the station to be heard on 97.7 FM as well as 1290 AM.

== Programming ==
Scott Ryfun hosts the station's local morning program; the remainder of the schedule consists of nationally-syndicated conservative talk shows, mostly from Premiere Networks.

== FM translator ==
Call sign	Frequency	City of license	FID	ERP (W)	HAAT	Class	Transmitter coordinates	FCC info
W249BS	97.7 FM	Savannah, Georgia	151866	250	143.4 m (470 ft)	D	32°3′26.6″N 81°8′46.7″W	LMS
