= Susan Weiner =

American politician (1946–2012)

62nd Mayor of Savannah, Georgia
- In office 1992–1996
- Preceded by: John Rousakis
- Succeeded by: Floyd Adams Jr.

Personal details
- Born: Susan Scher; 1945 or 1946 Albany, New York, U.S.
- Died: August 11, 2012 (aged 66) Gainesville, Georgia, U.S.
- Party: Republican
- Education: State University of New York at New Paltz
- Profession: Politician

Susan Scher Weiner (c. 1946 – August 11, 2012) was an American politician from U.S. state of Georgia, and was the first woman to become Mayor of Savannah. She was a Republican.

== Background ==
Weiner, who was Jewish, was born as Susan Scher in Albany, New York and graduated from SUNY New Paltz. She moved to Savannah in the mid-1980s.

== Political career ==
Weiner ran for Mayor of Savannah in 1991. She won the Republican nomination without opposition and defeated five-term incumbent and Democratic nominee John Rousakis with 54% of the vote. She conducted a law and order campaign in which she promised to address local crime issues. She also advocated "privatizing some city services, such as sanitation, garbage collection, road maintenance and recreational facility maintenance."

Weiner was the first woman mayor of Savannah.

Under her tenure, six council members were Democrats; only two were Republicans. Eventually, Weiner abandoned most proposals from her platform. In 1995, she was narrowly defeated by Councilor Floyd Adams Jr., a Democrat and an African-American.

== Later life and death ==
Weiner was a trainer for the Coverdell Leadership Institute from 1996 to 2004. In 2004, then Governor Sonny Perdue appointed her as executive director of the Georgia Council for the Arts.

Weiner died from complications of cancer in Gainesville, Georgia on August 11, 2012 at the age of 66.

== See also ==
- List of mayors of Savannah, Georgia
- List of first women mayors in the United States

== Footnotes ==
Political offices
Preceded by John Rousakis, Democrat	Mayor of Savannah; 1992-1996	Succeeded by Floyd Adams Jr., Democrat
