= Tina Tyus-Shaw =

American television journalist

Tina Tyus-Shaw (born in Griffin, Georgia) has been a television news anchor and journalist at WSAV-TV in Savannah, Georgia for more than 30 years.

Tina wanted to be a television broadcaster at an early age, and graduated from Tennessee State University with a Bachelor of Science degree in Speech, Communication and Theater.

She worked a series of radio and television jobs in Macon, Georgia; North Carolina; and Columbus, Georgia, before settling in Savannah in 1992. She started working for WSAV-TV in April of that year as a weekend news anchor but within just three years had made it to the main anchor position on the nightly news at 6 and 11.

In 1996 she was chosen to carry the Olympic Torch through Savannah. This continued an Olympic tradition in Tina's family. Her aunt Wyomia Tyus was a three-time gold medalist in 1964 and 1968.

She is best known to viewers as a champion for breast cancer survivors. Her popular Buddy Check 3 reminds women and men to do regular breast self exams each month.

She contributed to the 2016 book Shift Happens: Inspirational Stories on Finding Happiness, Achieving Success and Overcoming Obstacles about her experienced with miscarriage.
