= Floyd Adams Jr. =

American politician (1945–2014)

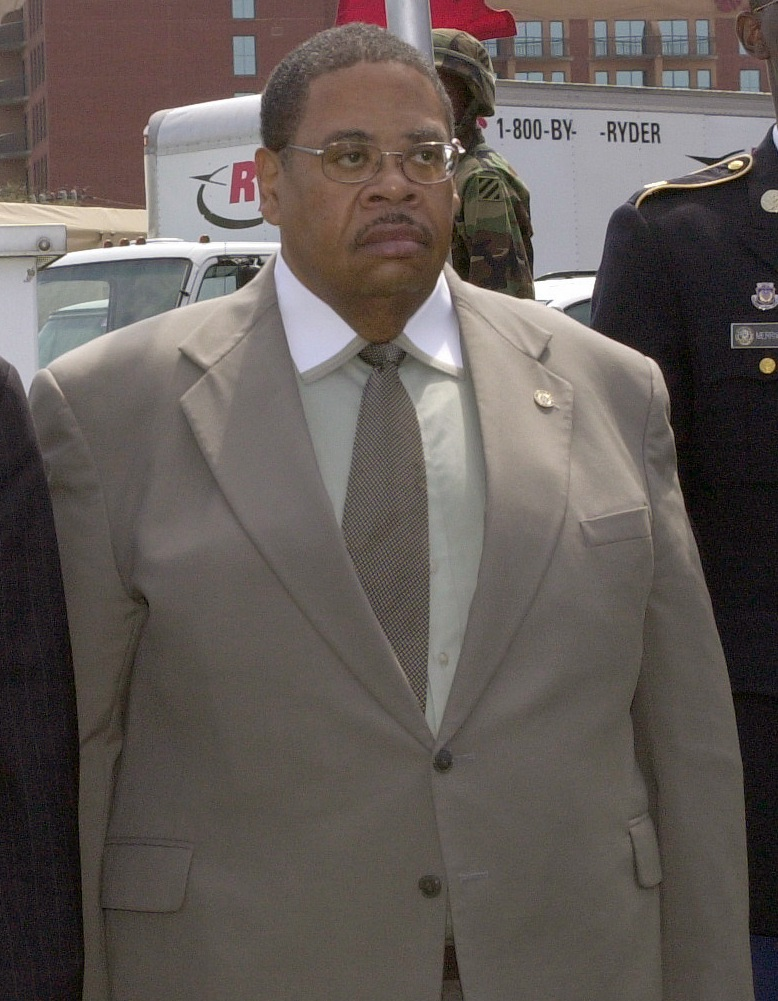
- Adams in 2002

63rd Mayor of Savannah, Georgia
- In office January 1996 – November 2003
- Preceded by: Susan Weiner
- Succeeded by: Otis Johnson

Personal details
- Born: May 11, 1945 Savannah, Georgia, U.S.
- Died: February 1, 2014 (aged 68) Savannah, Georgia, U.S.
- Party: Democratic
- Education: Armstrong Atlantic State University
- Profession: consultant newspaper publisher

Floyd Adams Jr. (May 11, 1945 – February 1, 2014) was an American politician from the U.S state of Georgia, and a former Mayor of Savannah, Georgia. He was a Democrat.

== Background ==
Adams was born on May 11, 1945, in Savannah, Georgia. He attended St. Pius X Catholic High School and received a degree from Armstrong Atlantic State University. He was married to Deborah Adams and has two grown children. He was a consultant and a newspaper publisher at the Herald of Savannah (Savannah Herald).

== Political career ==
Adams was first elected to Savannah's City Council in 1982. He defeated incumbent Roy L. Jackson, who represented the First District, which has been predominantly African-American. He won the Democratic nomination with 75% of the vote in 1986 and had no Republican opponents.

In 1992, he became Alderman at Large and served until 1996.

In 1995, he ran for Mayor of Savannah and won a narrow victory over Republican incumbent Susan Weiner. He took office in January 1996, becoming the first African-American mayor in the city's history.

Under his tenure, Savannah hosted the sailing competition during the 1996 Summer Olympic Games.

Adams was re-elected in 1999, but was prevented from seeking re-election in 2003 due to term limits.

In 2006, Adams ran for Savannah–Chatham County Board of Education President. He finished a close third, behind winner Joe Buck, a Republican, and Democratic incumbent Hugh Golson.

Adams entered the 2007 mayoral election in Savannah. His main opponents were incumbent Otis Johnson and former County Commissioner John McMasters. He was defeated by Johnson on November 6, 2007, finishing 2nd.

=== Death ===
On February 1, 2014, Adams died in Savannah at St. Joseph's Hospital, of undisclosed causes, and was buried with a Catholic funeral. He was 68 years old.

== Footnotes ==
Political offices
Preceded by Roy L. Jackson, Independent Democrat	Alderman of District #1; 1982–1992	Succeeded by David Jones, Democrat
Preceded by Leo Center, Democrat; Brooks Stillwell, III, Democrat	Alderman at Large; 1992–1996; With: Dana Braun, Democrat	Succeeded by Gary Gebhardt, Republican; Pete Liakakis, Democrat
Preceded by Susan Weiner, Republican	Mayor of Savannah; 1996–2004	Succeeded by Otis Johnson, Democrat
