= WLVH =

Radio station in Hardeeville, South Carolina, serving Savannah, Georgia

Coordinates: 32.0965°N 81.319194°W

- Hardeeville, South Carolina; United States
- Broadcast area: Savannah metropolitan area
- Frequency: 101.1 MHz
- Branding: Love 101.1

Programming
- Format: Urban Adult Contemporary
- Affiliations: Premiere Networks

Ownership
- Owner: iHeartMedia, Inc.; (iHM Licenses, LLC)
- Sister stations: WAEV, WQBT, WSOK, WTKS, WYKZ

History
- First air date: August 30, 1982; 43 years ago
- Call sign meaning: We LoVe SavannaH

Technical information
- Licensing authority: FCC
- Facility ID: 31094
- Class: C2
- ERP: 50,000 watts
- HAAT: 144 meters (472 ft)

Links
- Public license information: Public file; LMS
- Webcast: Listen Live
- Website: love1011.iheart.com

WLVH (101.1 FM) is a commercial radio station licensed to Hardeeville, South Carolina, and serving the Savannah metropolitan area. The station is owned by iHeartMedia and uses the branding "Love 101.1". It has an urban adult contemporary radio format. WLVH carries two nationally syndicated weekday programs: The Steve Harvey Morning Show in AM drive time and The Sweat Hotel with Keith Sweat in evenings.

WLVH is a Class C2 FM station with an effective radiated power (ERP) of 50,000 watts. The transmitter tower is west of Savannah in Bloomingdale, Georgia, along Interstate 16. The studios are on Alfred Street off U.S. Route 80 in Garden City (with a Savannah address).

== History ==
The station signed on the air on August 30, 1991, owned by Opus Media Group. In 2000, it was acquired by Capstar. Capstar was later acquired by Chancellor Media, a forerunner of today's iHeartMedia, Inc. In 2015, Clear Channel hired Sam Nelson as the director of urban programming for its stations in Savannah, including WLVH. He had been the program director of Urban AC station WUHT in Birmingham, Alabama.

WLVH was the Savannah affiliate of the Tom Joyner Morning Show until the program ended on December 13, 2019. Joyner's show was replaced by The Steve Harvey Morning Show.
