= WTGS =

Television station in Hardeeville, South Carolina

- Hardeeville, South Carolina; Savannah, Georgia; United States
- City: Hardeeville, South Carolina
- Channels: Digital: 26 (UHF); Virtual: 28
- Branding: Fox 28

Programming
- Affiliations: 28.1: Fox; for others, see § Subchannels

Ownership
- Owner: Sinclair Broadcast Group; (WTGS Licensee, LLC)

History
- First air date: September 1, 1985
- Former channel numbers: Analog: 28 (UHF, 1985–2009); Digital: 27 (UHF, 1999–2009), 28 (UHF, 2009–2020)
- Former affiliations: Independent (1985–1986)
- Call sign meaning: Thomas G. Sonsini, vice president of founding owner American Communications & Television

Technical information
- Licensing authority: FCC
- Facility ID: 27245
- ERP: 957 kW
- HAAT: 452.1 m (1,483 ft)
- Transmitter coordinates: 32°2′46″N 81°20′26″W

Links
- Public license information: Public file; LMS
- Website: fox28savannah.com

WTGS (channel 28) is a television station licensed to Hardeeville, South Carolina, United States, serving as the Fox affiliate for the Savannah, Georgia, area. Owned by Sinclair Broadcast Group, WTGS maintains transmitter facilities on Fort Argyle Road (SR 204) in western Chatham County, Georgia, while its studios are located in the Savannah Morning News building on Chatham Parkway in Savannah.

WTGS went on the air in 1985 as the first independent television station for Savannah and the southern Lowcountry and the lone commercial television station in southeastern South Carolina. Originally built by a Florida company, a change in federal regulations on cable carriage that took effect weeks before starting up nearly carried the station to the brink of bankruptcy. Between 1996 and 2014, WTGS was the junior partner in a series of operating agreements with WJCL (channel 22), Savannah's ABC affiliate. During much of this period, WJCL produced local newscasts for air on WTGS. However, the two stations were split in 2014 when WJCL's then-owner, LIN Media, and its affiliates opted to divest WJCL and WTGS to separate entities in order to complete a merger. The two stations continue to share office space, though Sinclair later brought news production in-house in 2016. From 2016 until its cancellation in 2024, WTGS's 10 p.m. newscast was produced from WPDE-TV in Myrtle Beach, South Carolina.

== History ==
=== Early years, cable disputes, and near-bankruptcy (1985–1996) ===
Business and Minority Coalition Broadcasters, Inc., a consortium of six investors from Charleston, South Carolina, filed an application with the Federal Communications Commission (FCC) to build a new television station on channel 28 in Hardeeville (15 miles (24 km) from the allocation city of Savannah, the maximum distance permitted), which would transmit from a site on St. Helena Island and reach audiences from Kiawah Island in the northeast to Savannah in the southwest. The FCC approved the license on November 17, 1981, and it took the call sign WTGS, with a planned start date in September 1982.

The WTGS construction permit was purchased in 1983 by American Communications and Television (AC&T), a company based in Gainesville, Florida. This cable and communications firm was making an incursion into new full-power and low-power independent stations across the country. It was another two years before movement began in earnest to build the station, whose founding general manager and 20% owner, John Bailie, had previously built two other Southern independents: WPTY in Memphis and WAWS-TV in Jacksonville. Planned programming included movies and children's programming in the morning and afternoon, with few commercial interruptions; Bailie stated that WTGS was the first TV station "programmed exclusively for the Lowcountry". The station signed on September 1, 1985, as the market's first general entertainment independent outlet.

On July 19, 1985 (a few months before WTGS officially signed on), a federal judge struck down the "must-carry" rule imposed by the FCC, which required cable television operators to carry all commercial over-the-air stations within 35 miles (56 km) of its community of service. This decision was challenging for WTGS, as Bailie felt that it would cause the new station to become "squeezed out of the market". By August 30, Savannah Cablevision, along with seven other local cable operators, had agreed to carry WTGS. However, two cable systems on the South Carolina side of the market, Plantation Cablevision on Hilton Head Island and Hargray Cablevision in Hardeeville, were among dozens of other local cable operators that refused to carry the station. WTGS was one of the first stations to pay for carriage on a cable system, leasing a channel from Savannah Cablevision for $2,000 a month (equivalent to $4,938 in 2024). In particular, WTGS stated that Plantation Cablevision refused to carry the station, as they considered it to be competition; however, Plantation Cablevision stated that they did not carry WTGS due to the removal of the must-carry rule. Plantation Cablevision also denied having wanted WTGS to pay for access to its cable system. The controversy continued that September, when Plantation Cablevision announced a new emergency warning system for Hilton Head Island. This angered Bailie, as he was concerned that those who did not subscribe to Plantation Cablevision's service would not be able to receive emergency information; WTGS decided to create its own emergency warning system instead.

The same month, Bailie went to Congress at the invitation of broadcasting groups, in order to speak to congressional leaders who were concerned that the repeal of the must-carry rule would hurt independent stations such as WTGS. The next month, Bailie revisited Congress in order to comment to the House Copyright Committee about bills in consideration at the time which would reform "compulsory license" rules. That same month, Plantation Cablevision was "carefully documenting requests" for WTGS to be added to its cable lineup and had sent out a questionnaire to subscribers in order to measure what viewers liked and disliked about the cable system. On December 27, 1985, Plantation Cablevision started to carry WTGS; the addition of WTGS removed Charleston stations WCBD and WCIV from the lineup. WTGS was a charter affiliate of Fox at its October 1986 launch.

In May 1987, the station was profiled on the MacNeil/Lehrer NewsHour, by which time it was so near to bankruptcy—due to its diminished ability to reach all TV homes in the region—that Bailie lived and slept in his office and drove a taxi cab the station had bought to promote the show Taxi. Later that year, AC&T sold itself to new Florida-based owners, giving it an infusion of $500,000 in cash. The new ownership moved the station's facilities south from Hardeeville to a site in Chatham County, Georgia, which would not be limited by height restrictions on a tower and be more centrally located for advertising sales purposes. The new tower was activated in February 1990. AC&T sold its two remaining stations, WTGS and KOOG in Ogden, Utah, to Trivest Financial Services Corporation in 1991.

=== Common operation with WJCL (1996–2014) ===
Licensee Hilton Head Television sold the station in 1996 for $7 million to LP Media, a company owned by Julius Curtis Lewis III. His father, Julius Curtis Lewis Jr., was the majority owner and namesake of WJCL television. The two stations came under common operation at that time. Lewis sold WJCL in 1998 to Grapevine Communications of Atlanta for $19 million, and in a parallel transaction, LP Media sold WTGS to Brissette Communications, owned by Paul Brissette, for $20 million. After Grapevine Communications, having purchased and changed its name to GOCOM in 1999, became Piedmont Television Holdings (owned by Brissette), WTGS was sold to Bluenose Broadcasting, a company owned by members of the Brissette family. Los Angeles-based Parkin Broadcasting (later PBC Broadcasting), owned by Todd Parkin, purchased WTGS for $17.5 million in 2007, in tandem with New Vision Television acquiring WJCL—and WJCL's option to buy WTGS's assets—for the same price. The two stations moved out of WJCL's longtime Abercorn Street studios to the vacant third floor of the Savannah Morning News building in 2011, establishing a content partnership with the newspaper. In 2012, LIN TV Corporation purchased New Vision Television and WJCL, which included a tandem sale of WTGS and two other PBC-owned stations that New Vision operated—KTKA-TV in Topeka, Kansas, and WYTV in Youngstown, Ohio—to Vaughan Media.

During Super Bowl XLVIII, WTGS notably aired a two-minute long advertisement by local personal injury lawyer Jamie Casino, which featured a thriller-styled retelling of how he stopped representing "cold-hearted villains" to avenge the shooting death of his brother Michael Biancosino in 2012, culminating with Casino digging through a grave with a sledgehammer. The ad gained media attention following the game as a viral video, and while the station did not provide exact numbers, a WTGS spokesperson stated that the ad was its most expensive advertising sale in history.

=== Sinclair Broadcast Group ownership (2014–present) ===
On March 21, 2014, LIN Media entered into an agreement to merge with Media General in a $1.6 billion deal. Because Media General already owned NBC affiliate WSAV-TV (channel 3), the companies were required to sell either WSAV or WJCL to another station owner in order to comply with FCC ownership rules as well as planned changes to those rules regarding same-market television stations which would prohibit sharing agreements.

On August 20, Media General announced that it would keep WSAV and sell WJCL to Hearst Television. It also would swap WTGS and television stations in Providence, Rhode Island, and Green Bay, Wisconsin, in exchange for properties that Sinclair Broadcast Group owned or was acquiring in Colorado Springs, Colorado; Harrisburg, Pennsylvania; and Tampa. Sinclair also acquired the right to purchase other WTGS assets from WTGS Television LLC. The sale was completed on December 19.

== Newscasts ==
Through a news share agreement established in 1996, WJCL produced a nightly prime time newscast on WTGS for the station from 1996 to 2016. On June 1, 2016, WJCL ceased producing the newscast for WTGS, and Sinclair took production in-house. The news program was produced and presented from WPDE-TV in Myrtle Beach, using a local staff of seven. Sinclair ended production of WTGS's local newscasts on May 31, 2024, replacing them with Sinclair's syndicated The National Desk.

== Technical information ==
=== Subchannels ===
WTGS maintains transmitter facilities on Fort Argyle Road (SR 204) in western Chatham County, Georgia. The station's signal is multiplexed:

Subchannels of WTGS
Subchannel	Res.	Short name	Programming
28.1	720p	FOX	Fox
28.2	480i	Comet	Comet
28.3	480i	Antenna	Antenna TV (4:3)
28.4	480i	ROAR	Roar
28.5	480i	Charge!	Charge!
28.6	480i	TheNest	The Nest
28.7	480i	Rewind	Rewind TV

=== Analog-to-digital conversion ===
WTGS ended regular programming on its analog signal, over UHF channel 28, on February 17, 2009, the original target date on which full-power television stations in the United States were to transition from analog to digital broadcasts under federal mandate (which was later pushed back to June 12, 2009). The station's digital signal relocated from its pre-transition UHF channel 27 to channel 28. It was then repacked to channel 26 in 2020.
