= John Rousakis =

American politician (1929–2000)

John Paul Rousakis (January 14, 1929 – December 11, 2000) was a politician from Georgia, United States, and was the first Greek-American to become Mayor of Savannah. He was a Democrat.

== Background ==
He was born in Savannah, Georgia, on January 14, 1929 and was a member of St. Paul's Greek Orthodox Church. After graduating from Savannah High School, he earned a basketball scholarship to the University of Kentucky. After a career-ending injury, he transferred to the University of Georgia, from which he graduated with a Bachelor of Business Administration degree in 1952. While a student, he was a member of the Lambda Chi Alpha fraternity. He served in the United States Army during the Korean War. In 1953, Rousakis married Irene Fotopoulos (1933–1985), and they later had four children. Prior to entering politics, he was an insurance agent.

== Electoral history ==
Rousakis was elected to the Chatham County Commission in 1965 and eventually became Vice-Chairperson of that institution.

He ran for Mayor of Savannah in 1970. He won the Democratic nomination and defeated one-term incumbent and Republican nominee Julius Curtis Lewis, Jr. with 55% of the vote.

He won re-election in 1974, 1978, 1982 and 1986.

His fifth term was extended by a year by the Georgia General Assembly, but Rousakis was defeated by Republican contestant Susan Weiner in 1991 with 46% of the vote.

He attempted a political comeback in 1995, but finished third with only 23% of the vote.

== Achievements ==
Under Rousakis' mayorship, River Street was revitalized, the police department and public work activities were modernized and the unpolluting of the Savannah River was undertaken. However, the situation of public housing worsened and the local crime and murder rates increased.

In 1976, he played the role of a hotel clerk in a scene in the movie Gator.

== Later life and death ==
After his wife's death in 1985, Rousakis married Elizabeth Lattimore Sparks (b. 1948). Rousakis died on December 10, 2000.

== Footnotes ==
Political offices
Preceded by Julius Curtis Lewis, Jr., Republican	Mayor of Savannah; 1970-1992	Succeeded by Susan Weiner, Republican
