= WTOC-TV =

Television station in Savannah, Georgia, United States

- Savannah, Georgia; United States
- Channels: Digital: 23 (UHF); Virtual: 11
- Branding: WTOC 11; The News

Programming
- Affiliations: 11.1: CBS; for others, see § Subchannels

Ownership
- Owner: Gray Media; (Gray Television Licensee, LLC)

History
- First air date: February 14, 1954
- Former channel numbers: Analog: 11 (VHF, 1954–2009); Digital: 15 (UHF, 2002–2009), 11 (VHF, 2009–2023)
- Former affiliations: All secondary: NBC (1954–1956); DuMont (1954–1956); ABC (1954–1970)
- Call sign meaning: "Welcome to Our City"

Technical information
- Licensing authority: FCC
- Facility ID: 590
- ERP: 1,000 kW
- HAAT: 441.6 m (1,449 ft)
- Transmitter coordinates: 32°3′15″N 81°21′0″W
- Translator(s): WPHJ-LD 15 Savannah (11.1 → 19.2); W25GF-D Baxley, GA; W31FD-D Bluffton–Hilton Head, SC

Links
- Public license information: Public file; LMS
- Website: www.wtoc.com

WTOC-TV (channel 11) is a television station in Savannah, Georgia, United States, affiliated with CBS and owned by Gray Media. The station's studios are located off Chatham Center Drive in Savannah's Chatham Parkway section, and its transmitter is located along Fort Argyle Road/SR 204 in unincorporated Chatham County.

== History ==
On October 15, 1929, WTOC radio signed on as the first radio station in the Savannah area. It was an enterprise of civic group Junior Board of Trade that was the forerunner of the Savannah Jaycees. It was later purchased by William Knight, Jr., who eventually added an FM station in 1946.

On February 14, 1954, Knight took a great financial risk and established WTOC-TV as the first television station in the Savannah area. WTOC-AM-FM had long been the area's CBS Radio Network affiliate, so WTOC-TV joined CBS and has been with the network ever since. It carried programming from all four networks for two years until WSAV-TV (channel 3) signed-on in 1956 and took the NBC affiliation. WTOC-TV then shared ABC with WSAV-TV until WJCL-TV (channel 22) signed-on in 1970.

Channel 11 originally operated from studios on Abercorn Street in downtown Savannah. A self-supporting triangle-shaped tower was perched atop the studio. In 1957, WTOC activated its current 1,500-foot (460 m) tower along Fort Argyle Road in southwestern Chatham County. This significantly increased its coverage area. The original tower is still used as a backup to this day, and is a landmark of the downtown area.

Knight sold WTOC-AM-FM-TV to Aflac in 1979. That company sold off the radio stations with the AM station becoming WTKS and the FM station WQBT. In 1996, Aflac sold its entire television group, including WTOC, to a group headed by Retirement Systems of Alabama which merged it with Ellis Communications to form Raycom Media. As a condition of the Aflac-Ellis broadcast merger, Raycom had to sell off WSAV, which Ellis had just bought a year earlier. This situation arose because the FCC did not permit duopolies at the time; this rule was partially repealed in 2000 with a caveat that a duopoly is possible with at least eight full-power stations owned by different companies, but cannot consist of two of the four highest-rated stations in the market. In addition, Savannah had only six full-power television stations at the time, which was too few to accommodate a duopoly.

In 1995, it moved to new facilities (known as "The News Place") on the west side of Savannah at Chatham Parkway in 1995. Since that time, the downtown building has become offices for the President of Savannah College of Art and Design.

On June 25, 2018, Atlanta-based Gray Television announced it had reached an agreement with Raycom to merge their respective broadcasting assets (consisting of Raycom's 63 existing owned-and/or-operated television stations, including WTOC-TV), and Gray's 93 television stations) under the former's corporate umbrella. The cash-and-stock merger transaction valued at $3.6 billion – in which Gray shareholders would acquire preferred stock currently held by Raycom – resulted in WTOC becoming a sister station to CBS/NBC affiliate WRDW-TV and WAGT-CD in Augusta (while separating it from WFXG). The sale was approved on December 20 and completed on January 2, 2019.

== News operation ==
WTOC has led the local Nielsen ratings in Savannah for most of the time since records have been kept. While WSAV and WJCL made a serious threat in the 1970s, WTOC has won every timeslot since 1980, often garnering more viewers than its rivals combined. Its dominance is so absolute that the station currently calls its newscasts simply The News. WTOC airs more than seven hours of news a day, a considerable amount for a station in the 97th market and far more than any other station in Savannah. WTOC is the only station in Savannah to air a midday newscast. On August 24, 2015, WTOC introduced the market's first 7 p.m. newscast.

The station won both Emmy and Edward R. Murrow awards for news gathering efforts in 2003. In addition, the station pulled in eleven Georgia Associated Press Awards in 2004. In 2005, Chris Clark won an Emmy for his football special and an Edward R. Murrow award for his story about a high school football player. In 2006, an Emmy was awarded to Mike Manhatton and Zach Powers for Freedom Fighters, a story about 3rd Infantry Division soldiers in Iraq. In 2007, Zach Powers, Alex Monarch, and Chris Clark won an Emmy for editing a special series on Rosa Parks. The same year, Chris Clark won the Emmy for best sports reporter.

On October 10, 2010, WTOC became the second station in Savannah to begin broadcasting news in high definition. Its half-hour weekday afternoon show at 4 p.m. is streamed live online. Since CBS Sports programming can sometimes preempt the 6 p.m. hour on Saturdays, WTOC also airs a newscast at 7 p.m. The station operates its own weather radar (known as "Doppler Max 11") at its studios.

On September 26, 2011, then-sister outlet Fox affiliate WFXG in Augusta launched its first ever in-house news operation. In partnership with a news director based at WTOC in Savannah, WFXG hired multimedia journalists to shoot, edit, and report coverage in the Augusta area. At this point, five personalities have joined that station and work out of WFXG's facility. All anchors for news, weather and sports are provided by WTOC and the nightly prime time broadcast at 10 p.m. originates live from this station's studios.

Until September 2019, WTOC broadcast CBS This Morning on a one-hour delay, unlike other CBS stations in the Eastern Time Zone, instead airing an extended version of The News at Daybreak at 7 a.m. On September 16, 2019, however, the delay ended when WTOC started broadcasting a new local talk show Morning Break at 9 a.m., which pushed CBS This Morning back an hour to the network's recommended timeslot.

== Technical information ==
=== Subchannels ===
The station's signal is multiplexed:

Subchannels of WTOC-TV
Subchannel	Res.	Short name	Programming
11.1	1080i	WTOCDT	CBS
11.2	480i	Bounce	Bounce TV
11.3	480i	The365	365BLK
11.4	480i	Grit	Grit
11.5	480i	ion	Ion
11.6	480i	ionMYS	Ion Mystery
11.7	480i	PSN	Peachtree Sports Network

=== Analog-to-digital conversion ===
WTOC-TV discontinued regular programming on its analog signal, over VHF channel 11, on June 12, 2009, the official date on which full-power television stations in the United States transitioned from analog to digital broadcasts under federal mandate. The station's digital signal relocated from its pre-transition UHF channel 15 to VHF channel 11 for post-transition operations.
