= WYKZ =

Coordinates: 32.328806°N 80.937889°W

- Beaufort, South Carolina; United States
- Broadcast area: Hilton Head - Savannah metropolitan area
- Frequency: 98.7 MHz
- Branding: 98.7 The River

Programming
- Format: Adult contemporary
- Affiliations: Premiere Networks

Ownership
- Owner: iHeartMedia, Inc.; (iHM Licenses, LLC)
- Sister stations: WAEV, WLVH, WQBT, WSOK, WTKS

History
- First air date: August 8, 1962
- Former call signs: WBEU-FM (1962–1981); WQLO (1981–1984)
- Call sign meaning: Former branding in the early '90s as Kiss FM

Technical information
- Licensing authority: FCC
- Facility ID: 67680
- Class: C1
- ERP: 100,000 watts
- HAAT: 218 meters (715 ft)

Links
- Public license information: Public file; LMS
- Webcast: Listen live (via iHeartRadio)
- Website: 987theriver.iheart.com

WYKZ (98.7 FM) is a commercial radio station licensed to Beaufort, South Carolina, United States, serving Hilton Head and the Savannah metropolitan area. It airs an adult contemporary format branded as "98.7 The River". It is owned by iHeartMedia with studios on Alfred Street in Savannah, Georgia.

The transmitter tower is near Sun City, South Carolina.

== History ==
The station signed on the air on August 8, 1962. The original call sign was WBEU-FM. It was the sister station to WBEU 960 AM (now deleted). WBEU-AM-FM at first simulcast their programming. WBEU-FM later had a separate beautiful music format. But it was only powered at 16,000 watts, a fraction of its current output. And it used a short tower so the station primarily was heard only in Beaufort County.

The station started broadcasting from a taller tower with more power in the early 1980s. With the upgraded signal, it began targeting Savannah as soft adult contemporary WQLO "98.7 Lite FM". The station was known as "Kiss 98.7" for most of the 1980s before adopting its current name and call letters in the early 1990s. It also picked up the tempo to a more mainstream AC sound.

WQLO was owned by Capstar Media. Capstar later merged with Chancellor Media, which was acquired by San Antonio-based Clear Channel Communications in 2000. Clear Channel changed its name to iHeartMedia in 2014.
