= WJCL (TV) =

Television station in Savannah, Georgia, United States

- Savannah, Georgia; United States
- Channels: Digital: 22 (UHF); Virtual: 22
- Branding: WJCL 22

Programming
- Affiliations: 22.1: ABC; for others, see § Subchannels

Ownership
- Owner: Hearst Television; (WJCL Hearst Television LLC)

History
- Founded: July 18, 1970
- Former call signs: WJCL-TV (1970–1981)
- Former channel numbers: Analog: 22 (UHF, 1970–2009); Digital: 23 (UHF, 2001–2009)
- Former affiliations: ABC (1970–1982); NBC (1982–1985); UPN (secondary, 1995–1997)
- Call sign meaning: Julius Curtis Lewis (founding owner)

Technical information
- Licensing authority: FCC
- Facility ID: 37174
- ERP: 350 kW
- HAAT: 436 m (1,430 ft)
- Transmitter coordinates: 32°3′30″N 81°20′18″W

Links
- Public license information: Public file; LMS
- Website: www.wjcl.com

WJCL (channel 22) is a television station in Savannah, Georgia, United States, affiliated with ABC. Owned by Hearst Television, the station maintains a transmitter in unincorporated western Chatham County, near Bloomingdale. Its studios are located in the Savannah Morning News building on Chatham Parkway in Savannah. The building also houses its former sister station, Hardeeville, South Carolina–licensed Fox affiliate WTGS (channel 28, now owned by the Sinclair Broadcast Group), which now operates separately from WJCL.

== History ==
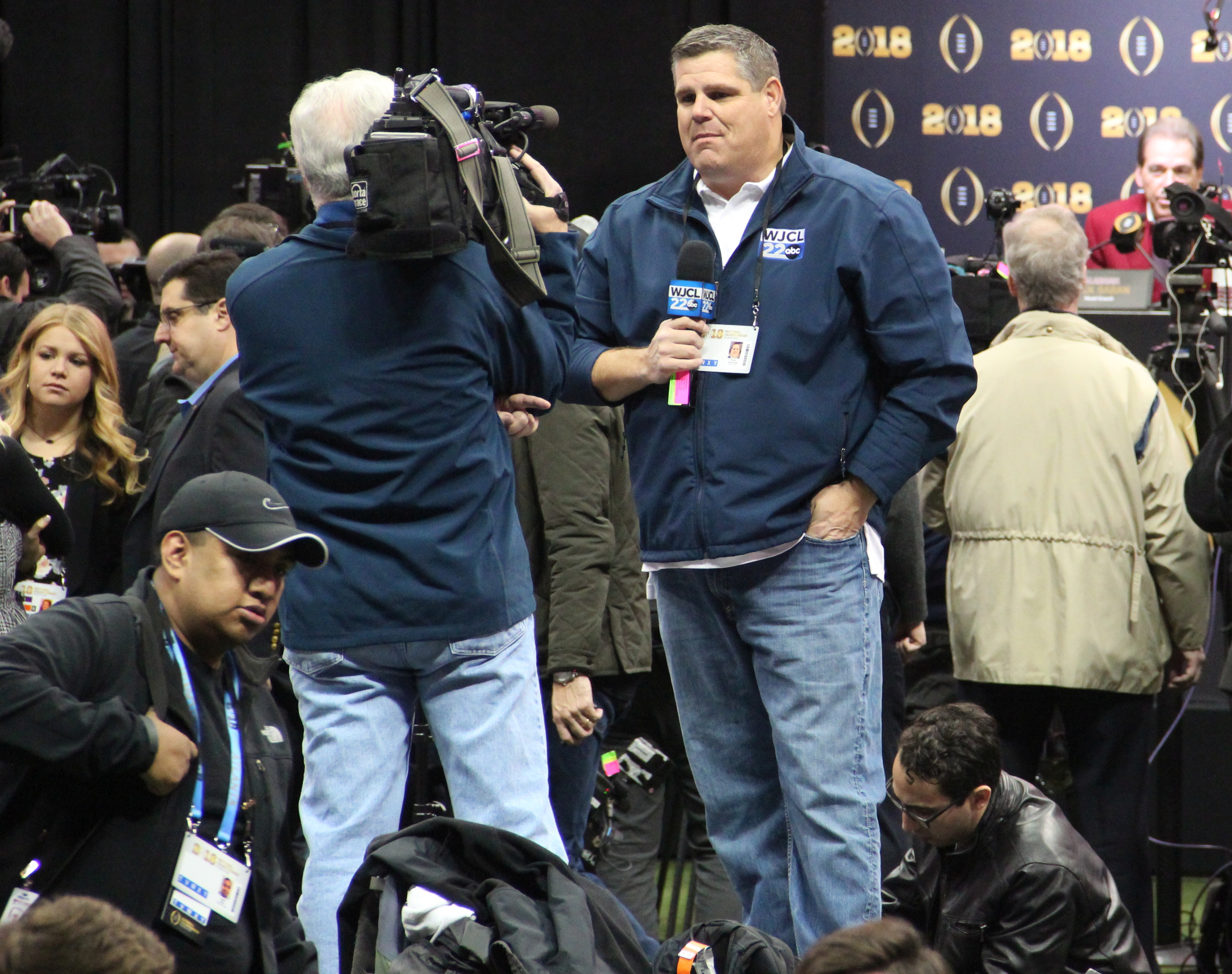
WJCL anchors at the 2018 College Football Playoff National Championship media day

The station began operations on July 18, 1970. It was the fourth television station to launch in Savannah and immediately became the area's first-ever primary ABC affiliate. Prior to channel 22 signing on, CBS affiliate WTOC-TV (channel 11) and NBC affiliate WSAV-TV (channel 3) shared secondary affiliations with ABC. Originally owned by former Savannah mayor and avid amateur radio operator Julius Curtis Lewis Jr. (whose initials provided the call sign), the station marked many "firsts". At the time, it built the tallest broadcast tower in the market rising some 1,500 feet (460 m) above sea level.

Local color news film and reel-to-reel videotape were introduced to the Savannah market by WJCL. It claims to have been the first station in the area to televise a live event (President Richard Nixon's Savannah visit and ride in a parade on Skidaway Road) as well as broadcasting in stereo. WJCL-TV and WJCL-FM 96.5 were both run by Lewis Broadcasting's executive vice president, J. Fred Pierce, from 1972 until the television station's first sale in 1999. Channel 22 dropped the "-TV" suffix from the callsign in 1981.

In 1982, WJCL swapped affiliations with WSAV (due to the latter's action) and became an NBC affiliate. In 1985, WSAV was one of several ABC affiliates nationwide unhappy with the network's weak prime time programming offerings. That year, WJCL returned to ABC, while WSAV reverted to being an NBC affiliate full-time. When Lewis purchased the WNOK television and radio stations in Columbia, South Carolina, in 1977, he quickly sold off WNOK radio (for an undisclosed price) and immediately changed the television outlet's callsign to WLTX. In 1982, he purchased WYEA in Columbus, Georgia, from Aflac and changed its calls to WLTZ to follow a similar call letter format used for his station in South Carolina's capitol ("LT" meaning "Lewis Television").

In the early 1990s, Lewis sold two of his radio stations, WSTZ-FM and WZRX in Jackson, Mississippi, for an undisclosed price. In 1999, Lewis Broadcasting sold WJCL to Grapevine Communications, which merged with Piedmont Television around the same time. In the mid-to-late 1990s, Lewis decided to divest an even larger portion of his media interests and sold four of his combined eight owned and/or previously owned radio and television stations including WJCL, WTGS, WJCL-FM, and WLTX. Lewis died in 2005, and on May 1, 2007, Lewis Broadcasting, by then owned by his son, Julius Curtis Lewis III, entered into an agreement with SagamoreHill Broadcasting to sell-off its last remaining television station, WLTZ. In 1995, WJCL became a charter UPN affiliate as a secondary basis until 1997 when former WB affiliate WUBI took over the UPN affiliation.

In 2001, WJCL partnered with Carleton Public Relations, Inc. to produce ABC 22 LawCall. Radio on-air personality Lexie Kaye was hired by Carleton Public Relations as producer of the weekly live, legal call-in show. The program featured Mike Avery as host along with attorneys from the Carter & Tate firm with a weekly guest and various topics. This was the first legal call-in show in the nation to use the "LawCall" name. The show aired until June 2006 on Sundays from 11 to 11:30 p.m. WJCL and WTGS were sold to New Vision Television (a prior incarnation of New Vision once owned rival WSAV) and Parkin Broadcasting respectively in 2007. The station unveiled a new blog-based website in June 2007.

On November 2, 2007, it was announced that with the recent acquisition of WJCL by New Vision, a brand new website was on the way. The revamped website (operated largely in-house with technology borrowed from Broadcast Interactive Media) featured the usual news, weather, and sports along with streaming video. In January 2009, the websites of WJCL and several of its sister stations migrated to the Inergize Digital Network platform (with KOIN in Portland, Oregon, being the first station in the New Vision group featuring it). The station is the setting of the second season of TV Guide Network's Making News which began airing on June 4, 2008.

On May 7, 2012, LIN TV Corporation announced that it would acquire the New Vision Television station group for $330.4 million and the assumption of $12 million in debt. Along with the outright ownership of WJCL, the agreement included the acquisition of New Vision's shared services agreement with Parkin Broadcasting, giving LIN operational control of WTGS. On October 2, the FCC approved the proposed sale to LIN TV. The transaction was completed on October 12.

On March 21, 2014, LIN Media entered into an agreement to merge with Media General in a $1.6 billion deal. Because Media General already owned NBC affiliate WSAV-TV, the companies were required to sell either WSAV or WJCL to another station owner in order to comply with FCC ownership rules as well as planned changes to those rules regarding same-market television stations which would prohibit sharing agreements. On August 20, 2014, Media General announced that it would keep WSAV and sell WJCL, along with WVTM-TV in Birmingham, Alabama, to Hearst Television, with WTGS going to Sinclair Broadcast Group. The sale was completed on December 19, and Hearst closed on its purchase of WJCL and WVTM on December 22.

== News operation ==
Through a news share agreement established in 1996, WJCL produces a prime time newscast on its now-former sister station (known as WTGS Fox News at Ten). For a while, WTGS also simulcast WJCL's Good Morning Show on weekdays (from 5 until 7) but it was dropped at some point. WTGS replaced WJCL's newscast with one produced by its own stations WPDE-TV in June 2016.

WJCL and WTGS combined operations with the Savannah Morning News and were relocated to the newspaper's facility on Chatham Parkway in Savannah. The stations began broadcasting at their new location on October 4, 2011. The station has an hour of news at 5 p.m. with a weekday morning show that airs WTGS from 7 to 8 a.m. WJCL does not air a midday show during the week, but did add weekend morning newscasts in March 2020.

=== Notable former on-air staff ===
- Rich Edson
- Rob Fowler – meteorologist (1982)
- Audrey Puente – meteorologist

== Technical information ==
=== Subchannels ===
The station's signal is multiplexed:

Subchannels of WJCL
Subchannel	Res.	Short name	Programming
22.1	720p	WJCL-HD	ABC
22.2	480i	MeTV	MeTV
22.3	480i	STORY	Story Television (4:3)
22.4	480i	IonPlus	Ion Plus
22.5	480i	getTV	Great (4:3)
22.6	480i	HSN	HSN

Subchannel broadcast with MPEG-4 video

=== Analog-to-digital conversion ===
WJCL ended regular programming on its analog signal, over UHF channel 22, on February 17, 2009, the original target date on which full-power television stations in the United States were to transition from analog to digital broadcasts under federal mandate (which was later pushed back to June 12, 2009). The station's digital signal relocated from its pre-transition UHF channel 23 to channel 22.
