= WQBT =

Coordinates: 32.046028°N 81.340667°W

- Savannah, Georgia; United States
- Broadcast area: Savannah, Georgia; Hilton Head, South Carolina
- Frequency: 94.1 MHz
- Branding: "94.1 the Beat"

Programming
- Language: English
- Format: Urban Contemporary
- Affiliations: Premiere Networks

Ownership
- Owner: iHeartMedia, Inc.; (iHM Licenses, LLC)
- Sister stations: WAEV, WLVH, WSOK, WTKS, WYKZ

History
- First air date: 1946; 80 years ago
- Former call signs: WTOC-FM (1946–1979); WCHY (1979–1987); WCHY-FM (1987–1999); WSCA (1999–2001)
- Call sign meaning: "WQBeaT"

Technical information
- Facility ID: 8594
- Class: C0
- ERP: 100,000 watts
- HAAT: 396 meters (1,299 ft)

Links
- Webcast: Listen Live
- Website: 941thebeat.iheart.com

WQBT (94.1 FM, "94.1 The Beat") is a Urban Contemporary radio station licensed to Savannah, Georgia. It is owned by iHeartMedia, Inc. Its studios are located in Garden City (with a Savannah address) and utilizes a transmitter located west of Savannah in unincorporated Chatham County.

== Programming ==
The station had controversial morning hosts Star and Buc Wild—which replaced Russ Parr in the morning slot. Parr's show has since returned to WQBT's morning drive time slot, but as of 2016, it is now home to The Breakfast Club.

== History ==
Before the mid-1970s, the station was a simulcast of WTOC, and had the callsign of WTOC-FM. Before it was an urban contemporary formatted station, it had a long stint as a country music formatted station to compete with daytimer WEAS. In the late 1980s and early 1990s, the callsign WCHY (which stood for “We’re Country Hits, Y’all”) was part of the station's identity as a country station ("WCHY 94.1 Continuous Country"; the station would sometimes refer to itself as "Y-94").

WCHY (the former WTOC) and WCHY-FM were sold by Roth Broadcasting in 1995 to WP Radio, which in turn was selling its stations to Patterson Broadcasting as WP Radio left the business.

Later, in the late ‘90s, this station was WSCA-FM - "Cat Country 94". The format flip to its current Urban format was in December 2001.

== See also ==
- List of radio stations in Georgia (U.S. state)
- Georgia (U.S. state)
- Lists of radio stations in North and Central America
