= Otis Johnson =

American social worker, educator and politician

The Honorable Mayor Otis Samuel Johnson
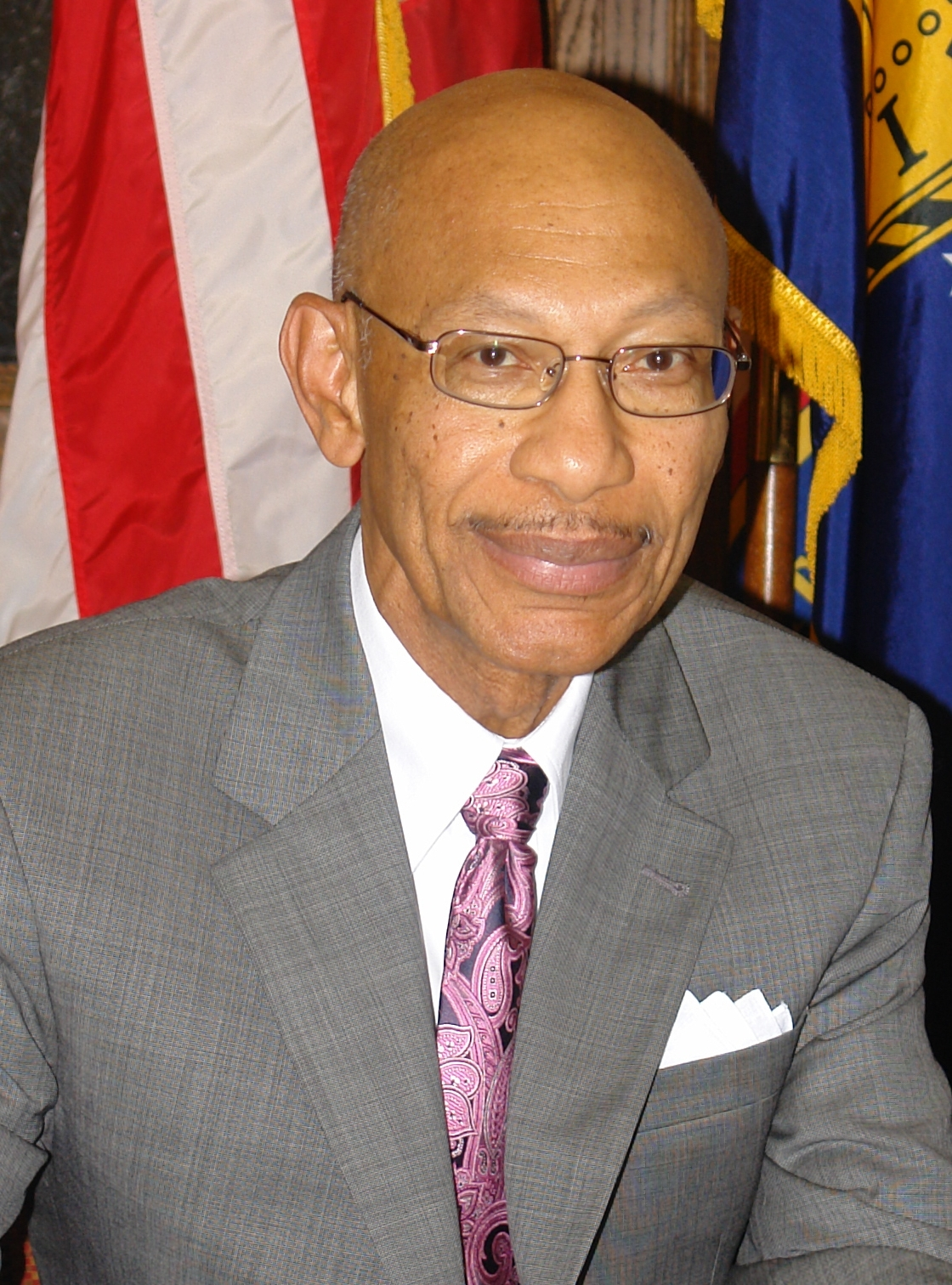

64th Mayor of Savannah, Georgia
- In office Jan. 1, 2004 – Jan. 1, 2012
- Preceded by: Floyd Adams Jr.
- Succeeded by: Edna Jackson

Personal details
- Born: February 3, 1942 (age 84) Savannah, Georgia, U.S.
- Party: Democratic
- Spouse: Shaffon Johnson
- Education: A.E. Beach High School; Armstrong Junior College; University of Georgia; Clark Atlanta University; Brandeis University
- Profession: Social Scientist and Professor
- Website: official site

Otis Samuel Johnson (born February 3, 1942) is an American social worker, educator and politician from the U.S. state of Georgia who served as the Mayor of Savannah from 2004 until 2012. He is a member of the Democratic Party.

== Background ==
Mayor Johnson is a Savannah native who graduated from A.E. Beach High School in 1960, Armstrong Junior College (now Armstrong State University) in 1964 (the first African American to graduate from that school) and the University of Georgia (A.B.) in 1967. He served from 1959 to 1965 in the U.S. Naval Reserve. In 1969, he earned a master's degree in social work from Clark Atlanta University and, in 1980, he received his Ph.D. from the Heller School of Social Policy and Management at Brandeis University.

Before becoming mayor, Johnson worked for the Economic Opportunity Authority, Model Cities Program, and Savannah State University. From 1983 until 1988, he served as the City Council Representative from the second district of Savannah. He then became the Executive Director of the Chatham Savannah Youth Futures Authority.

== Political career ==
=== City Alderman ===
Johnson served as the Alderman of District #2 in Savannah from 1982 to 1988. He resigned in 1988 to accept a position as Executive Director of the Chatham Savannah Youth Futures Authority.

=== County Board of Education ===
In 1999, he began a four-year term on the Savannah-Chatham County Board of Education.

=== Mayor ===
In November 2003, Johnson was elected to a four-year term as Mayor of Savannah against two-term Alderman Pete Liakakis (Democrat), and four other candidates. He took office in January 2004.

In April 2005, Mayor Johnson publicly challenged Savannah's African American community to begin a concerted effort to address the city's high crime rate, especially in predominantly black neighborhoods of the city. Johnson stressed that criminal acts in Savannah were often perpetrated by young African American males on their own community, and he called a series of well-attended town meetings to address the problem.

On April 2, 2007, Johnson announced he would seek reelection to the office of Mayor. His second campaign is similar to the first in that he is focused on neighborhood improvement, crime reduction, poverty reduction and providing more affordable housing. While campaigning, Johnson announced that Savannah had been declared a Preserve America city by the U. S. Department of Housing and Urban Development.

On November 6, 2007, Johnson beat a field of 5 other candidates to win a second term as Mayor. Johnson got 12,826 votes. His nearest competitor got 2,359 votes.

Johnson endorsed candidate Barack Obama in the presidential election of 2008.

== Personal life ==
In 2006, Otis Johnson was hospitalized after he had a heart attack while attending a conference for black mayors. While he was away from City Hall for weeks, he made a full recovery.

== Electoral history ==
Mayor of Savannah, 2003

Threshold > 50%

First Ballot, November 4, 2003

Candidate	Affiliation	Support	Outcome
Pete Liakakis	Democratic	34%	Runoff
Otis Johnson	Democratic	33%	Runoff
Frank Rossiter	Democratic	17%	Defeated
Dicky Mopper	Republican	16%	Defeated
Others	n/a	1%	Defeated

Second Ballot, November 25, 2003

Candidate	Affiliation	Support	Outcome
Otis Johnson	Democratic	51%	Elected
Pete Liakakis	Democratic	49%	Defeated

Mayor of Savannah, 2007

Threshold > 50%

First Ballot, November 6, 2007

Candidate	Affiliation	Support	Outcome
Otis Johnson	Democratic	12,826 (70%)	Elected
Floyd Adams, Jr.	Democratic	2,359 (13%)	Defeated
John McMasters	Republican	2,205 (12%)	Defeated
Others	n/a	1,023 (5%)	Defeated

== Footnotes ==
Political offices
Preceded by Floyd Adams Jr. (Democrat)	Mayor of Savannah; 2004–2012	Succeeded by Edna Jackson (Democrat)
Preceded by Leon Chaplin (Democrat)	Council Member, District 2; 1982–1988	Succeeded by Willie Brown (Democrat)
