= WEAS-FM =

Coordinates: 32.046°N 81.341°W

- Springfield, Georgia; United States
- Broadcast area: Savannah metropolitan area
- Frequency: 93.1 MHz
- Branding: E93

Programming
- Format: Urban Contemporary

Ownership
- Owner: Cumulus Media; (Cumulus Licensing LLC)
- Sister stations: WIXV, WJCL-FM, WTYB

History
- First air date: August 1967
- Call sign meaning: Easy

Technical information
- Licensing authority: FCC
- Facility ID: 71366
- Class: C1
- ERP: 96,640 watts
- HAAT: 299 meters (981 ft)

Links
- Public license information: Public file; LMS
- Webcast: Listen live; Listen live (via iHeartRadio)
- Website: e93fm.com

WEAS-FM (93.1 FM, "E93") is a commercial radio station licensed to Springfield, Georgia, United States, and serving the Savannah metropolitan area. It airs an urban contemporary format and is owned by Cumulus Media. Its studios are on Television Circle in Savannah.

WEAS-FM's transmitter is situated off Fort Argyle Road (Georgia SR 204), west of Savannah, in unincorporated Chatham County.

== History ==
WEAS-FM signed on the air in August 1968. It was an easy listening station, originally licensed to Savannah. It was automated, playing quarter-hour sweeps of mostly soft, instrumental music. WEAS-FM was partnered with an AM sister station that played country music. The AM station had formerly been WJIV, with an R&B format, until 1960, and later as WEAS. The AM and FM stations were once owned by E.D. "Dee" Rivers, Jr, son of a former governor of Georgia.

WEAS-FM ended its automation and hired live disc jockeys. It switched to freeform progressive rock in the early part of the 1970s. By the mid-1970s, WEAS-FM flipped to Contemporary R&B, the forerunner of today's urban sound. WEAS's AM companion at 900 AM changed to a sports radio format. It is now silent.

WEAS-FM moved its city of license from Savannah to Springfield to allow 103.9 WTYB to move to Tybee Island, within the Savannah metropolitan area. Since the late 1970s, WEAS-FM has targeted the African-American population in the Savannah area.

== Former on-air staff ==
During WEAS-FM's time as Sunday morning Urban Gospel music programming:

- Deacon Charles L. Palmer who established the "Stairways to Heaven" Program (1991–1997)

During WEAS's time as a country music station:

- JayAllen Brimmer (1960–1969)
- Norman "Lefty" Lindsey (1961–1970), father of Lawanda Lindsey
- Everett Langford (1963–1967) (was also Chief Engineer)
- Tex Lowther (1969–1975) The Bumper to Bumper Club
