= WJCL-FM =

Coordinates: 32.058°N 81.338°W

- Savannah, Georgia; United States
- Broadcast area: Savannah metropolitan area; Hilton Head
- Frequency: 96.5 MHz (HD Radio)
- Branding: Kix 96

Programming
- Format: Country
- Subchannels: HD2: Simulcast of WSEG (sports radio)
- Affiliations: Westwood One

Ownership
- Owner: Cumulus Media; (Cumulus Licensing LLC)
- Sister stations: WEAS-FM; WIXV; WTYB

History
- First air date: June 18, 1972
- Call sign meaning: Named for founder J. Curtis Lewis

Technical information
- Licensing authority: FCC
- Facility ID: 37178
- Class: C
- ERP: 100,000 watts
- HAAT: 354 meters (1,161 ft)

Links
- Public license information: Public file; LMS
- Webcast: Listen live; Listen live (via iHeartRadio)
- Website: www.kix96.com

WJCL-FM (96.5 MHz, "Kix 96") is a commercial radio station in Savannah, Georgia. It is owned by Cumulus Media and it airs a country music format. It carries the syndicated Kincaid & Dallas morning drive time show from WKHX in Atlanta. The studios are on Television Circle in Savannah.

WJCL-FM is a Class C FM station. The effective radiated power (ERP) is 100,000 watts, the maximum for most FM stations. The transmitter is on Fort Argyle Road amid other FM and TV towers, west of the city in unincorporated Chatham County. WJCL-FM serves as the secondary Emergency Alert System radio station for the region.

== History ==
=== Easy listening ===
The station signed on the air on June 18, 1972. It has always had the WJCL-FM call sign. WJCL-FM was founded by J. Curtis Lewis, Jr., who operated the radio station in conjunction with WJCL-TV on the south side of Savannah, adjacent to his car dealership. The call letters are the founder's initials. Lewis, a former mayor of Savannah, sold the TV station in 1999 to Grapevine Communications.

WJCL-FM carried an easy listening music format, a mix of instrumentals and soft vocals. Savannah broadcasting pioneer Al Jennings not only managed the station, he was a frequent on-air presence, voicing numerous commercials, sports reports, and programs featuring big band music and adult standards. A personal friend of Savannah native son Johnny Mercer, Jennings often paid tribute to the legendary songwriter with radio shows featuring unique insights and trivia.

WJCL-FM was one of the first radio stations in the area to use an automation system to play music and commercials, following WEAS-FM's earlier attempts in the late 1960s, which did not succeed. During morning and afternoon drive times, live announcers were used. Over time, the easy listening format was expanded to include soft adult contemporary music.

Other notable personalities on the station in its early years included Ben Mayo, host of an afternoon program called "Music with Mayo", Joe Cox, known to a generation of Savannahians as weatherman "Cap'n Sandy", Charlie Solomons, who played drums in a local big band and featured big band music on his morning show, and Pete Preston, who was also a weathercaster on WJCL-TV. Morning and afternoon news updates were read by veteran local newscaster Richard Lantz.

=== Country music ===
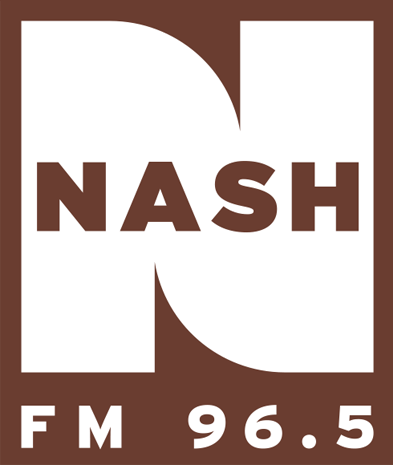
Nash FM logo from 2013–2015

In the late 1980s, many easy listening stations saw their audiences aging, while most advertisers seek a younger audience. The station flipped to country music in the early 1990s. It began calling itself "KIX 96 1/2". Notable DJs in the country format included Big Mac, Bill West, Tyler Morgan, Jay Scott, Boomer Lee, Mike Miller and Laura Anderson.

The station was a powerhouse, becoming the top country station in the market. The main country competitor in Savannah, WCHY, saw its ratings decline. It changed to an urban contemporary format as WQBT.

WJCL-FM began using the "Nash FM" branding in 2013. On December 4, 2015, WJCL-FM stopped calling itself "Nash FM" and reverted to its former "Kix 96" branding.
