= WIXV =

Radio station in Savannah, Georgia

Coordinates: 32.058°N 81.338°W

- Savannah, Georgia; United States
- Broadcast area: Savannah, Georgia; Hilton Head, South Carolina
- Frequency: 95.5 MHz
- Branding: I-95

Programming
- Language: English
- Format: Classic rock
- Affiliations: United Stations Radio Networks; Westwood One

Ownership
- Owner: Cumulus Media
- Sister stations: WEAS-FM, WJCL-FM, WTYB

History
- First air date: April 24, 1972; 54 years ago (as WSGF-FM)
- Former call signs: WSGF-FM (June 8, 1971-July 15, 1983)
- Call sign meaning: The station's frequency in Roman numerals (IX = 9, V = 5)

Technical information
- Facility ID: 54799
- Class: C1
- ERP: 98,000 watts
- HAAT: 301.2 meters

Links
- Webcast: Listen Live; Listen Live via iHeart
- Website: i95savannah.com

WIXV (95.5 FM, "I-95") is a classic rock formatted radio station licensed to Savannah, Georgia, United States. It is owned by Cumulus Media.

== History ==
=== WSGF-FM ===
WIXV began as WSGF-FM. An application for WSGF-FM, and the callsign, was originally applied for on June 8, 1971; however, an earlier application for the station to operate on 102.1 MHz was tendered in 1969. WSGF-FM began broadcasting on April 24, 1972, & would receive its license to broadcast on April 11, 1973. WSGF-FM originally broadcast a middle-of-the-road (MOR) format. The station changed callsigns to WIXV on July 15, 1983.

The station started as in 1972 as WSGF ("95SGF"), a Top 40-leaning adult contemporary station. The station was highly successful against other competitors such as 1400 AM and Z102. By 1983, seeing the gap left by Wave 97 when they dropped album rock earlier that year, WSGF had become WIXV and added more hard rock to the playlist.

=== I-95 ===
In 1986 I-95 became Savannah's full-time rock station. In 1998, Savannah Communications sold WIXV to Cumulus Broadcasting. Bringing in legendary programmers like Bill Weston, Virgil Thompson, and Don Scott. Since then WIXV has oscillated between a hybrid mix of classic and newer rock. In recent years, the station reverted to classic rock. WIXV featured John Boy and Billy in the mornings for 15 years until they switched to the Bob and Tom show in January 2014.

On October 7, 2021, longtime host and program director Don Scott died at the age of 65 due to COVID-19, leaving a vacancy in the lineup of the station, as he was the host of the afternoon segment when most listeners would be leaving and coming home from work

In January 2022, former program director at Dick Broadcasting-owned Active Rock station WFXH (Rock 106.1), Marci Stanley-Boger, was hired by WIXV as their new program director; Boger had spent 14 years at WFXH.

In August 2026, Cumulus Media announced it would sell WIXV, along with KKEG, to Radio Training Network for $2,050,000.
