= Robert H. Anderson (Confederate officer) =

United States Army and Confederate States Army officer

Robert Houstoun Anderson
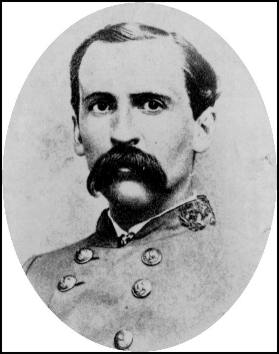
- Robert Houston Anderson
- Born: October 1, 1835; Savannah, Georgia, U.S.
- Died: February 8, 1888 (aged 52); Savannah, Georgia, U.S.
- Burial place: Bonaventure Cemetery, Savannah, Georgia
- Military career
- Allegiance: United States; Confederate States
- Branch: United States Army; Confederate States Army
- Service years: 1857–1861 (USA); 1861–1865 (CSA)
- Rank: Second Lieutenant (USA); Brigadier General (CSA)
- Unit: 9th U.S. Infantry Regiment
- Commands: Republican Blues; 1st Georgia Sharpshooter Battalion; Fort McAllister; 5th Georgia Cavalry; Anderson's Brigade; Kelly's Division; Georgia Hussars
- Conflicts: American Civil War: Battle of Fort McAllister (1863); Chattahoochee River; Battle of Noonday Creek; Battle of Atlanta; Buckhead; Kennesaw Mountain; Big Shanty; Battle of Decatur; Battle of Brown's Mill; Savannah Campaign; Carolinas campaign; Battle of Morrisville
- Other work: Police chief, Member of the USMA Board of Visitors

Robert Houston Anderson (October 1, 1835 – February 8, 1888) was a Confederate military officer during the American Civil War. A West Point graduate, he served as an infantry officer in the United States Army and later served as a brigadier general in the Confederate States Army. After the war he served as the Chief of Police for the city of Savannah, Georgia, for 23 years and was twice appointed to serve on the Visitor's Board of the United States Military Academy. With General Joseph Wheeler, Anderson played an important role in reunification, recommending improvements and changes at West Point such as electricity and the addition of a telephone in 1887.

== Early life ==
Born in 1835 in Savannah, Georgia, Anderson was the son of Captain John Wayne Anderson, a local businessman, and Sarah Ann Houston. His siblings include Major George Wayne Anderson, Captain John Wayne Anderson Jr. and Colonel Clifford Wallace Anderson. He was educated in the local schools before receiving an appointment to the United States Military Academy. "Bob" Anderson would return to West Point one day to help heal the wounds that the civil war would bring, as a member of the Board of Visitors after the war.

== US Army Service ==
After graduation from West Point in 1857, Anderson was made brevet second lieutenant with the 9th U.S. Infantry Regiment, but was immediately detached to become a cavalry instructor at West Point. Later he was stationed in upstate New York at Fort Columbus with the 9th Infantry. He later served as an infantry second lieutenant at Fort Walla Walla in the Washington Territory on frontier duty.

== Confederate States Army Service ==
In March 1861, shortly before the official secession of his home state, Anderson left the US Army and accepted a commission as a lieutenant of artillery in the Confederate Army, formally resigning his U.S. Army commission on May 17, 1861.

In September 1861 he was promoted to the rank of Major, and was acting adjutant general of the troops on the Georgia coast. Anderson was then appointed assistant adjutant general to Maj. Gen. W. H. T. Walker of the Georgia State militia located in Pensacola, Florida. When Walker's brigade was transferred to Virginia to join the Army of Northern Virginia in July 1861, Anderson went with him.

After Walker resigned, Anderson remained in Confederate service and was promoted to the rank of Major. In April 1862 Major Anderson formed the 1st Georgia Sharpshooter Battalion, and quickly built them into an effective and disciplined unit. The battalion was mustered at Camp Anderson, on the banks of the Ogeechee River. In early 1863 he was placed in command of nearby Fort McAllister, located just downriver from Savannah, Georgia to help slow the advancing Union ironclads. Fort McAllister was one of the key forts defending the port of Savannah, and would become the biggest obstacle in Sherman's March to the Sea.

Anderson was promoted to colonel and being placed in command of the 5th Georgia Cavalry. on January 20, 1863. He led Confederate defenses at the Battle of Fort McAllister (1863). General P. G. T. Beauregard in his official report to the war department, commended very highly the conduct of officers and men engaged in the successful defense of Fort McAllister in February 1863.

Anderson and the 5th Georgia Cavalry were transferred to the Army of Tennessee under General William W. Allen as part of Kelly's Division, under General Joseph Wheeler before the opening of the Atlanta campaign. Anderson earned a battlefield promotion to brigadier general of Cavalry on July 26, 1864. He was wounded at the Battle of Brown's Mill near Newnan, Georgia, on July 30, 1864, during the Atlanta Campaign. He rejoined his command at Briar Creek, fighting with Johnston and Hood. After the death of commanding officer Brig. Gen. John H. Kelly near Franklin, Tennessee, Anderson assumed temporary command of the division later resuming his position as brigade commander. He was wounded again at Fayetteville, North Carolina during the Carolinas campaign, on March 11, 1865.

Anderson would later lead his brigade against advancing Union forces, being wounded for a third time at the Battle of Griswoldville. Then he joined Wheeler's Cavalry Corps in the Carolinas campaign before the collapse of the Confederacy in April 1865. He surrendered with Johnston's army at Hillsboro, North Carolina, surrendering to General William T. Sherman on April 26, 1865, 17 days after Lee's surrender at Appomattox.

== Postbellum career ==
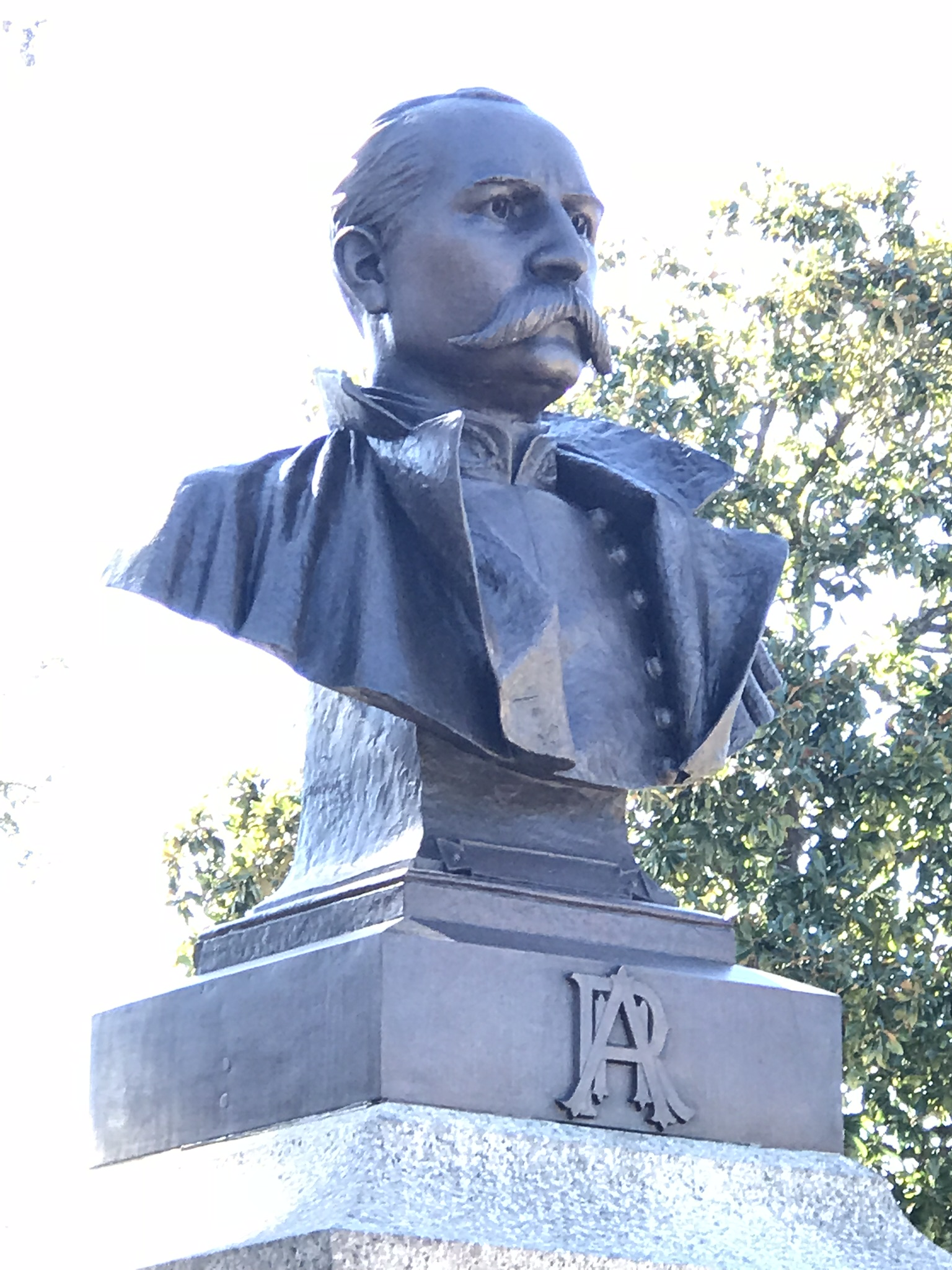
Bust of General Anderson, by Alexander Dole

Following the war, Anderson established and served as the police chief for the city of Savannah from 1865 to 1888. As Chief of Police for the city of Savannah, he brought order and through his leadership made the force one of the most effective in the nation. After founding the Georgia Sabre Club, Anderson was elected to Captain of the Georgia Hussars from December 4, 1876, to February 1880.

General Anderson was appointed by President Rutherford B. Hayes to the Board of Visitors, US Military Academy at West Point in 1879. The Board of Visitors is a panel that includes Senators, Congressional Representatives, and presidential appointees who "shall inquire into the morale and discipline, curriculum, instruction, physical equipment, fiscal affairs, academic methods, and other matters relating to the academy that the board decides to consider." As a member of the board, he chaired the committee for academics and discipline, and working alongside General "Fighting Joe" Wheeler helped reunite old friends, and assisted with reconciliation efforts. He was appointed again to the Board by the next president, Grover Cleveland in 1887 when they recommended bringing both the telephone and electricity to West Point.

As Police Chief, Anderson employed mostly veterans from both sides of the civil war in his force, putting his words of reconciliation into action.

== Personal life ==
Anderson married Sarah Clitz on December 3, 1857. She was the daughter of John Clitz, a U.S. Army officer from New York state. Her brothers were Union Navy officer John M. B. Clitz and Union Army officer Henry B. Clitz. Her sister Frances Clitz married Union Army officer Gustavus A. De Russy.

Robert and Sarah Anderson had two daughters and a son. Robert Houston Anderson Jr., served in the U.S. Army with distinction on the Mexican border, and in China before his death due to disease in the Philippines in 1901.

== Death ==
Robert Houston Anderson died in Savannah in 1888, aged 52, and was buried in Bonaventure Cemetery. An estimated 7,000 people attended the unveiling of a copper and granite monument, crowned with a bust of the general at Bonaventure in February 1894.

== Gallery ==
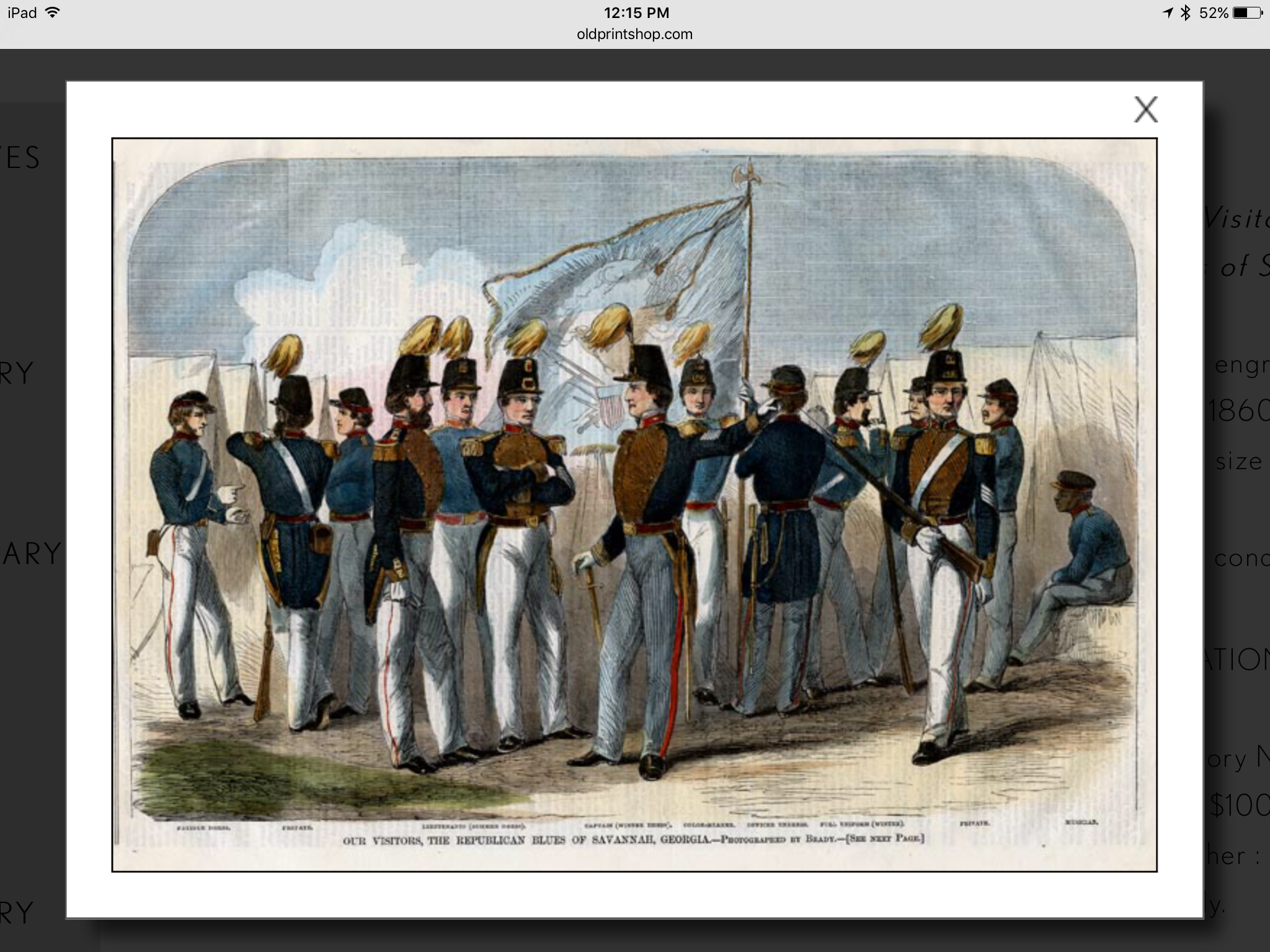
Republican Blues

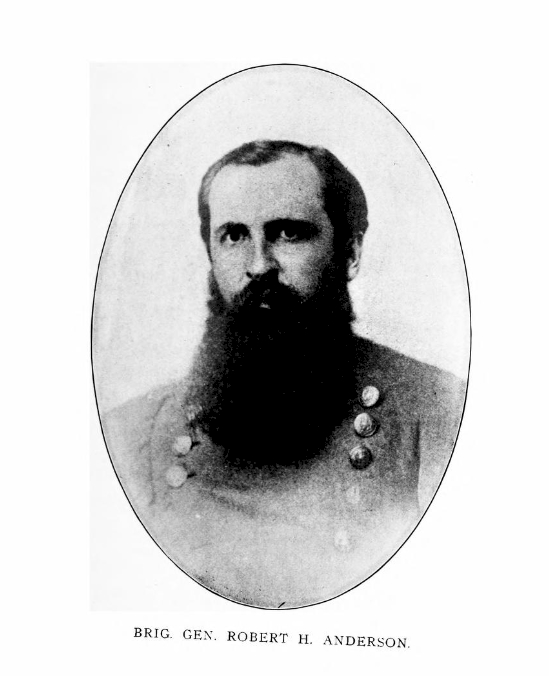
Brig. Gen. Anderson, 1864

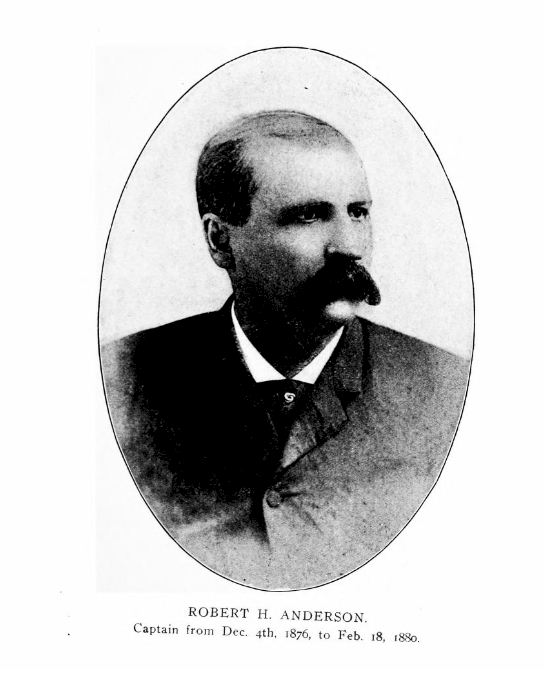
Anderson as commander of the Georgia Hussars as part of the militia, 1880.

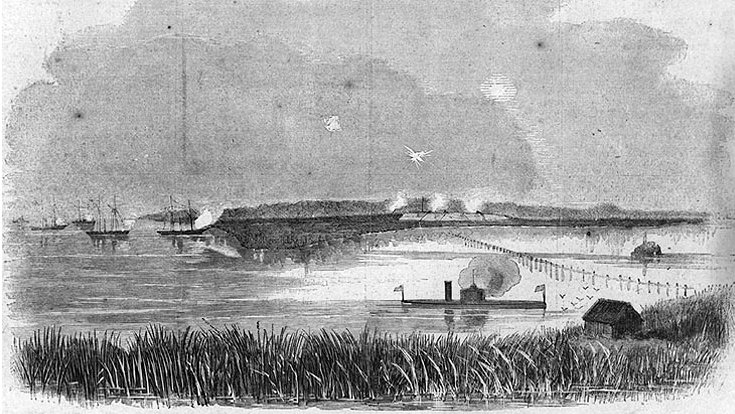
USS Montauk attacks Fort McAllister, Anderson being in command of the later.

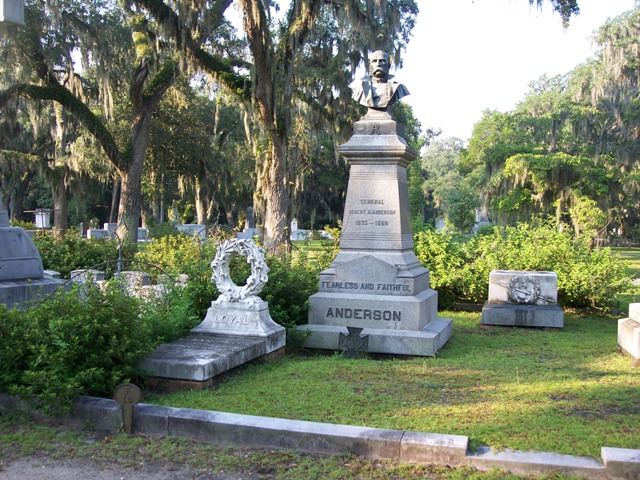
The Anderson Family Gravesite on Bonaventure Cemetery, Savannah.

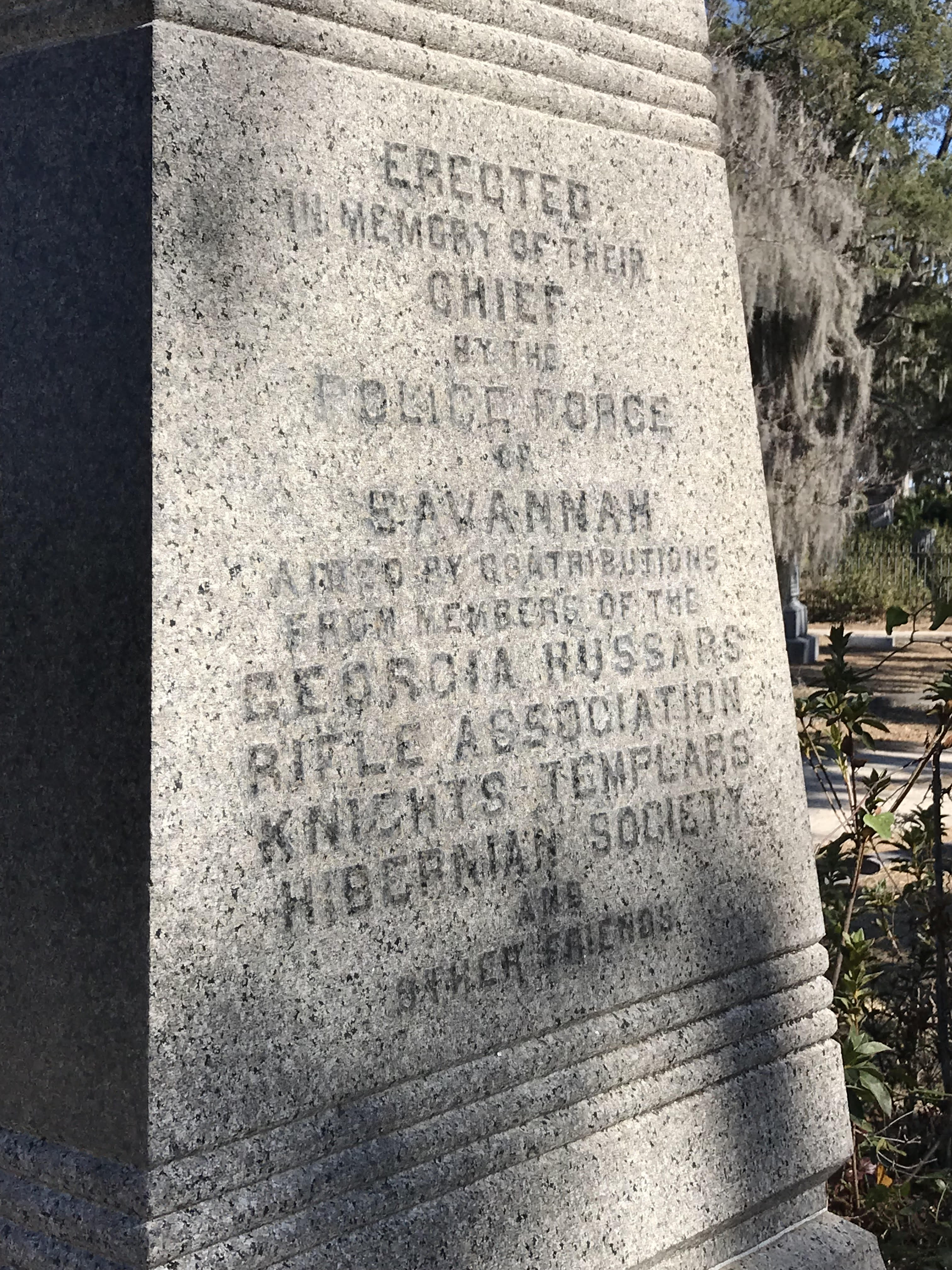
Robert Houston Anderson Monument Back at Bonaventure Cemetery, Savannah.

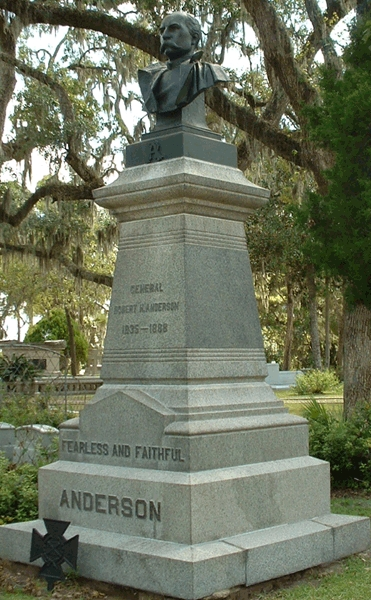
Gen. Anderson's monument on Bonaventure Cemetery, Savannah.

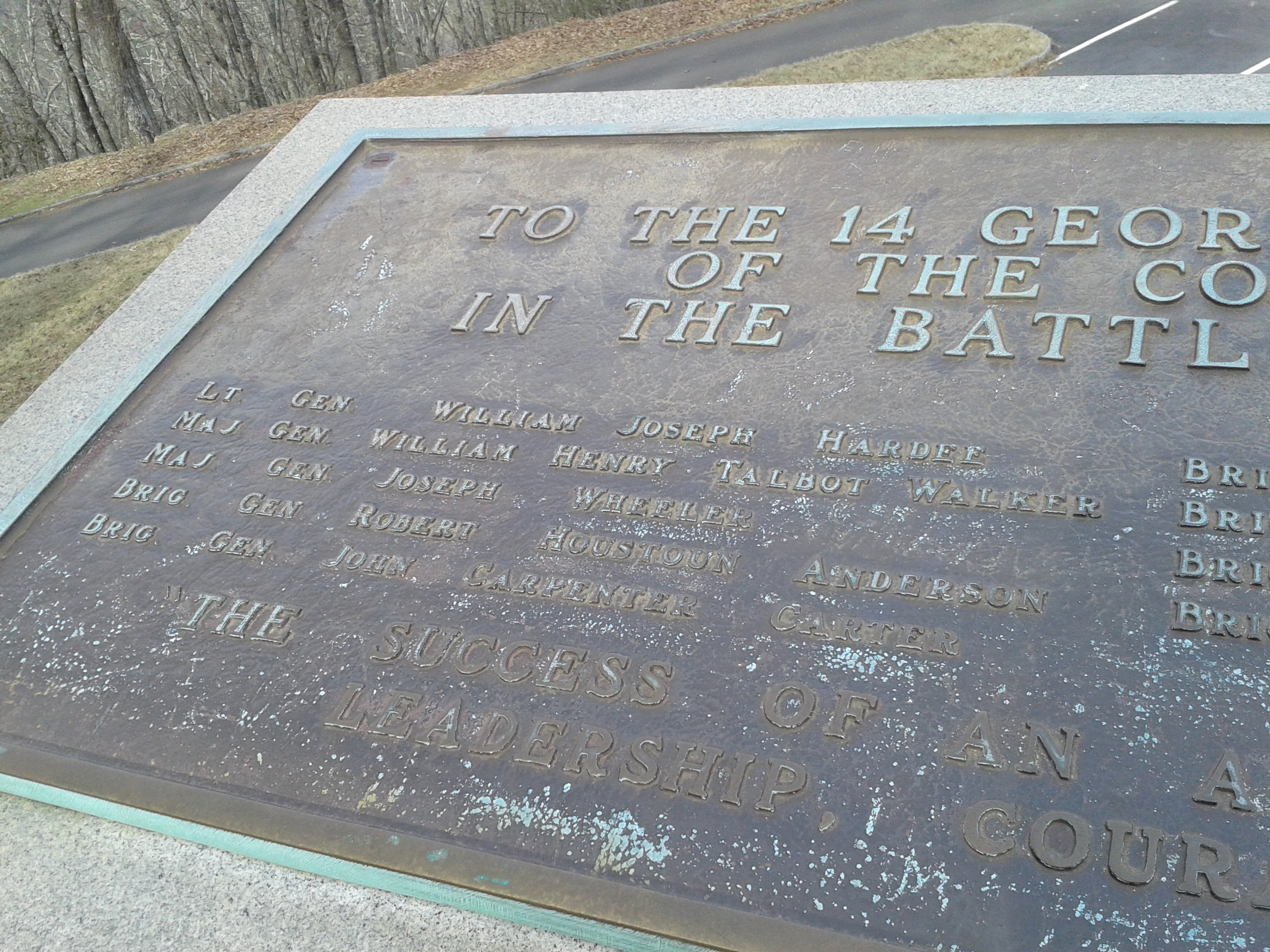
Kennesaw Mountain Battlefield Monument

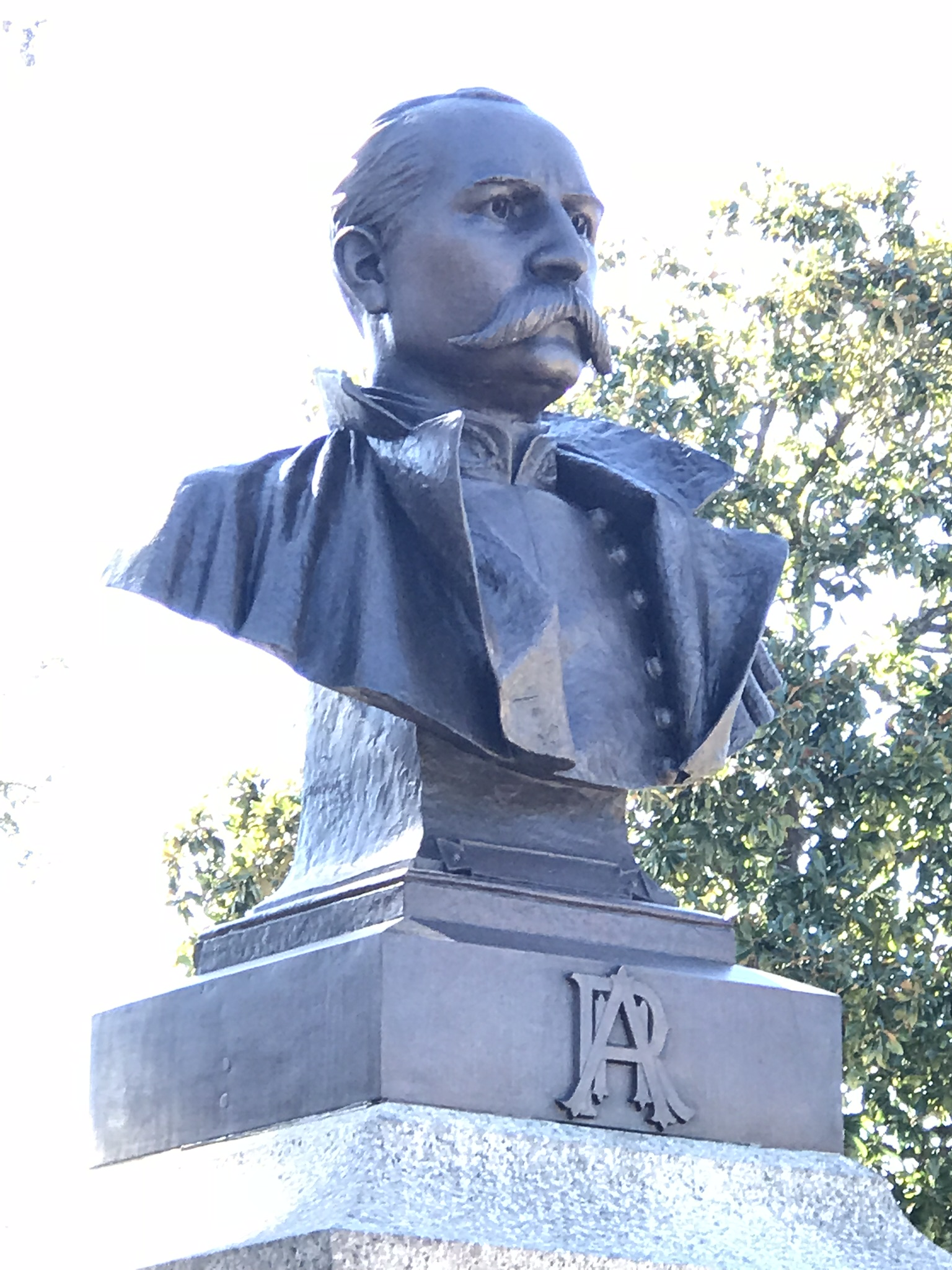
Robert Houston Anderson and Family at Bonaventure Cemetery

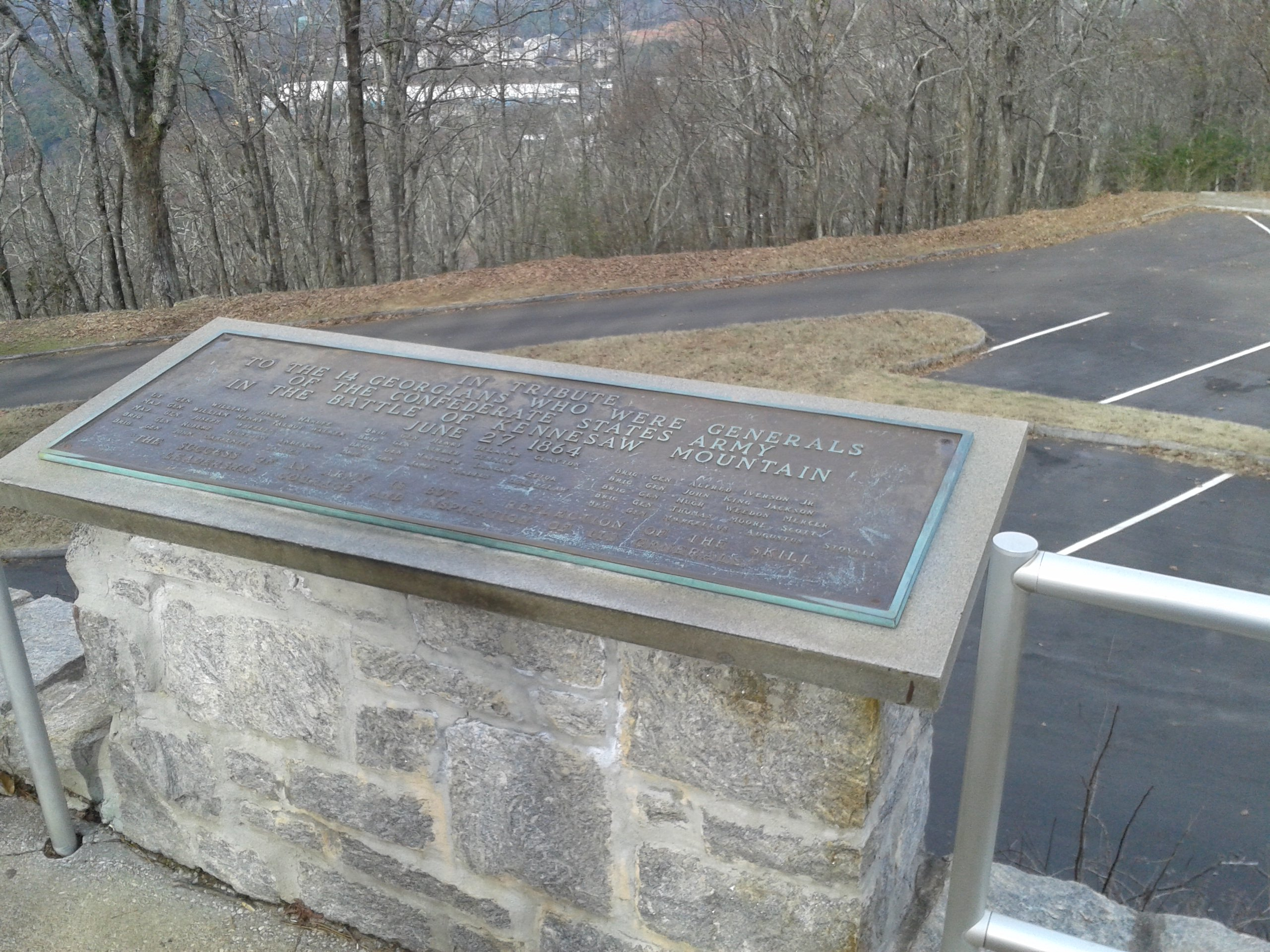
Kennesaw Mountain Battlefield Monument

== See also ==
- List of American Civil War generals (Confederate)
