= 1st Georgia Sharpshooter Battalion =

Infantry battalion of the Confederate States Army

1st Battalion, Georgia Sharpshooters
- Active: 1 June 1862 – 26 April 1865 (CSA)
- Country: Confederate States of America
- Allegiance: Georgia
- Branch: Confederate States Army
- Type: Sharpshooters
- Size: Battalion
- Garrison/HQ: Savannah, Georgia
- Engagements: American Civil War: Battle of Fort McAllister (1863); Battle of Jackson, Mississippi; Battle of Chickamauga; Chattanooga campaign; Battle of Peachtree Creek; Battle of Atlanta; Battle of Kennesaw Mountain; Battle of Jonesborough; Franklin–Nashville Campaign; Battle of Spring Hill; Battle of Franklin; Battle of Nashville; Battle of Bentonville

Commanders
- Notable commanders: Brig. Gen. Robert H. Anderson; Arthur Shaaf

The 1st Georgia Sharpshooter Battalion was a sharpshooter unit of the Confederate States Army during the American Civil War. It was authorized by an act in April 1862 by the Confederate Congress, and was formed in Savannah, Georgia. The 1st Battalion Sharpshooters served at Fort McAllister defending the coast of Georgia in the Battle of Fort McAllister (1863). They also saw action at the Battle of Jackson, Mississippi, as well as the Battle of Chickamauga, and the Chattanooga campaign. The battalion fought to the end of the war, their last engagement being at the Battle of Bentonville in March 1865.

== History and lineage ==
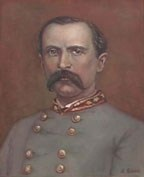
Brig. Gen. Robert H. Anderson, the original commander of the 1st Georgia Sharpshooters.

On June 1, 1862, Major Robert H. Anderson, who graduated from the US Military Academy at West Point in 1857, was serving as inspector general at the headquarters of the Department of South Carolina and Georgia in Charleston, SC. On that day he wrote a letter to Major General John C. Pemberton, the department commander. In his letter he asked the general to raise a battalion of four companies of sharpshooters; the men to be recruited from the regiments in the brigade of Brigadier General William Duncan Smith which was stationed in Savannah, Georgia. Pemberton gave his approval and Anderson began recruiting in the city. On June 20, Pemberton wrote to Adjutant and Inspector General Samuel Cooper in Richmond, VA nominating Anderson to be in command of the 1st Georgia Sharpshooter Battalion.

== Coastal Defense ==
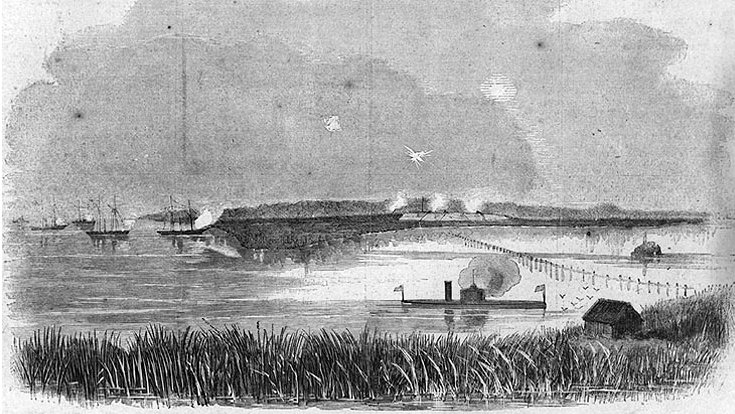
The USS Montauk attacks Fort McAllister; the 1st Georgia Sharpshooters being among the defenders.

The battalion was formed by early August, and on the 21st marched from Camp Pemberton to Camp Anderson, named for the battalion's commander, located on Wildhorn Plantation, about 12 miles from Savannah. Assigned to guarding strategic Fort McAllister in 1861, they helped repulse seven US Naval engagements to capture Fort McAllister, which protected Savannah. By lining the riverbank with sharpshooters, the defenders rained projectiles on the Union ironclads, forcing them to withdraw, and winning the praise of Confederate generals and congressmen alike. Anderson was promoted to command the 5th Georgia Cavalry, with Major Arthur Shaaf given formal command of the battalion in April 1863. On 5 May, they were ordered to Mississippi as part of General William H. T. Walker's brigade. The brigade moved to join the army being formed under General Joseph E. Johnston for the Battle of Vicksburg.

== Battle of Atlanta ==
The Sharpshooters stayed with the Army of Tennessee throughout the remainder of the conflict, seeing action in Chattanooga, Dalton, and Kennesaw Mountain. On June 27 Walker's Division, including the Georgian sharpshooters, was posted at the base of the mountain; at a place called 'the dead angle' where some of the fiercest fighting took place. For the next month, they resisted Union advances on Atlanta, and on July 20 they moved north along Peachtree Road, striking a Federal division south of Peachtree Creek. After being repulsed, Walker's division along with Hardee's Corps marched six miles south of the city, taking up position along the left flank of General McPherson's Union troops between Atlanta and Decatur.

On August 19, the 1st Battalion Georgia Sharpshooters marched with Hardee from Atlanta to East Point in an attempt to protect Atlanta's last rail connection. On August 30, they moved toward Jonesborough.

== Later service ==
On August 31, the 1st Sharpshooter Battalion was heavily engaged in what proved to be the final loss of Atlanta and the near destruction of the Army of Tennessee. Of the remaining members of the battalion, fifty percent were either killed, wounded or captured in the Battle of Jonesborough. Hardee's defeat allowed Hood to evacuate Atlanta, clearing Sherman's path to the sea. The battered unit wandered throughout Alabama in the fall, with the end coming in December at Franklin and Nashville. They moved throughout Tennessee and North Carolina, fighting at Bentonville before surrendering to General William T. Sherman on April 25, 1865 16 days after Appomattox.

== See also ==
- List of Georgia Confederate Civil War regiments
