= Republican Blues =

118th Field Artillery Republican Blues
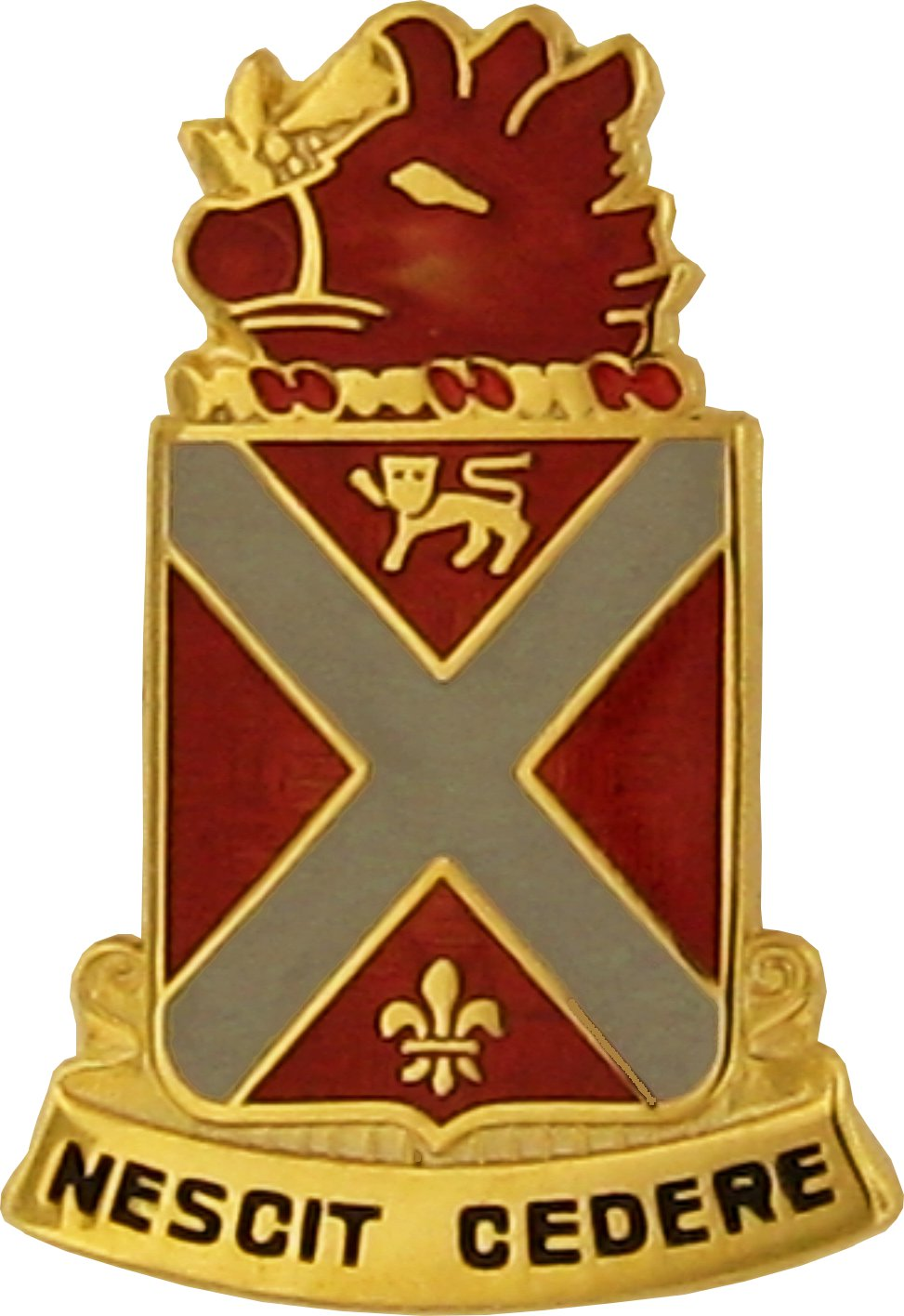
- 118th Field Artillery insignia
- Active: 1808–present
- Country: United States
- Allegiance: United States of America; Confederate States of America
- Branch: United States Army; Confederate States Army
- Type: Artillery
- Size: Brigade
- Garrison/HQ: Savannah, Georgia
- Nicknames: Blues (special designation); Lightning Brigade (former)
- Engagements: War of 1812; American Civil War; World War I World War II; Iraq Campaign; Afghanistan Campaign
- Decorations: Presidential Unit Citation; Meritorious Unit Commendation; French Croix de Guerre with Palm; Luxembourg Croix de Guerre; Belgian Fourragere

Commanders
- Notable commanders: Robert H. Anderson; John Wayne Anderson; George Wayne Anderson; William Daniel Dixon

The Republican Blues were a military company formed in Savannah, Georgia. The Blues were first organized in 1808 and served at Fort Jackson and in Florida during the War of 1812. The Blues, typical of Savannah's old military units, were a fraternal social organization and a well-trained military unit. The Blues defended Georgia's coast from the Union Navy between 1861 and 1864. Unlike most Confederate units formed during the Civil War, the Republican Blues had been an existing militia organization for over fifty years before the war started. They recruited from the most prominent families in and around Savannah. They fought in all the nations wars after The Civil War as part of the Georgia National Guard, with the lone exception being The Spanish–American War. Today they remain in service, as a modular artillery brigade of the Georgia Army National Guard, the 118th Field Artillery.

As part of the 48th Infantry Brigade, the 118th FA is of the oldest units in US Army history. It is one of few units in the US military that also saw service as a unit of the Confederate States of America during the US Civil War.

== History and lineage ==
The Republican Blues were originally organized in 1808, in Savannah, Georgia. It mustered into Federal service in June 1812, in Florida.

The unit was brought into Confederate service on 20 April 1861 at Savannah, GA and was reorganized and redesignated on 22 April 1861 as Company C, 1st Battalion, Georgia Infantry. The Blues joined eight other companies of Savannah militias to form the First Volunteer Regiment of Georgia. At the order of Governor Joseph E. Brown to occupy strategic Fort Pulaski, Commander of the Regiment, Colonel Alexander Lawton, and his adjutant Charles H. Olmstead would plan and execute the first act of rebellion in the state of Georgia, On January 3, 1861, a force of 134 men and 6 artillery pieces landed at the deserted fort, and raised the red star of Georgia for the first time. Most of the force was made up of men from the Savannah Volunteer Guards, the Chatham Artillery, Georgia Hussars, and the Oglethorpe Light Infantry.

Assigned to strategic Fort McAllister in 1862, they repulsed more than seven US Naval attempts to capture Fort McAllister, which protected Savannah. They successfully fought off Union ironclads, winning the praise of Confederate generals and congressmen. In May 1864, the Blues left Fort McAllister to reinforce Confederate Gen. Joseph E. Johnston's army in northern Georgia. After Union Maj. Gen. William T. Sherman's forces captured Atlanta, the Blues went into Tennessee and fought in the Battle of Nashville. It was during this time when the Blues began to show signs of the war. The Blues later marched into the Carolinas and surrendered to Sherman's army in the spring of 1865.

Once home, the Republican Blues continued their tradition of military service under the old flag. When the Spanish–American War broke out in 1898, the unit was mobilized and sent to Chickamauga, Georgia for training, but the war ended before they were deployed. In 1916 violence spilled over the US border in the south, requiring President Wilson to mobilize the National Guard to protect the US Border. Deployed after training in Macon at Camp Harris, the newly formed First Georgia Volunteer Infantry departed with the Georgia Brigade to Fort Bliss, near El Paso, Texas. They served along the border until February 1917, when the Brigade was sent home. Arriving in Savannah in March, they were informed that due to the growing war in Europe, they would not muster out. They made camp just outside Savannah where they performed guard duty until the US declared War in April. In early July 1917 they were sent back to Macon, joining the 31st Infantry (Dixie Division) forming the 118th Field Artillery assigned to the 56th Field Artillery Brigade. Other elements of the Blues were used to organize the 117th and 118th Machine Gun Battalions. Sailing to France that October, they were encamped at Brest, France when the armistice was signed, ending the war.

The unit was reorganized and designated Headquarters Battery, 118th Field Artillery, assigned to the 30th Infantry Division. With the onset of war, they again entered federal service in September 1940. As part of the 30th Division, they landed in France a week after D-Day and continued to fight across France and Belgium. In October 1944, they participated in the Siegfried Line breakthrough, then with the First Division encircled the town of Aachen. After helping blunt the enemy at the Battle of the Bulge, they raced across the continent to the Rhine River, then breaking out to trap thousands of enemy troops in the Ruhr Pocket.

From 1945 to 1973, the unit underwent a series of redesignations culminating in its current form, as part of the 48th Infantry Brigade. In 1993, the 118th Field Artillery Brigade was reorganized and as a result, the Second Battalion, 214th Field Artillery folded its colors and was retired from active duty service. This deactivation retired the name Republican Blues as well. Back home, returning to serve her home state yet again, in 1984-85 the 118th Field Artillery Brigade was headquartered at Savannah and comprised the 1st and 2nd Battalions of the 214th Field Artillery, both using 155-mm towed artillery pieces. The unit continues to serve as part of the Georgia National Guard and was recalled to serve in Bosnia, Iraq and Afghanistan most recently. Soldiers in the 48th currently wear the 3rd Division unit insignia as part of their alignment with an active duty unit.

== Gallery ==
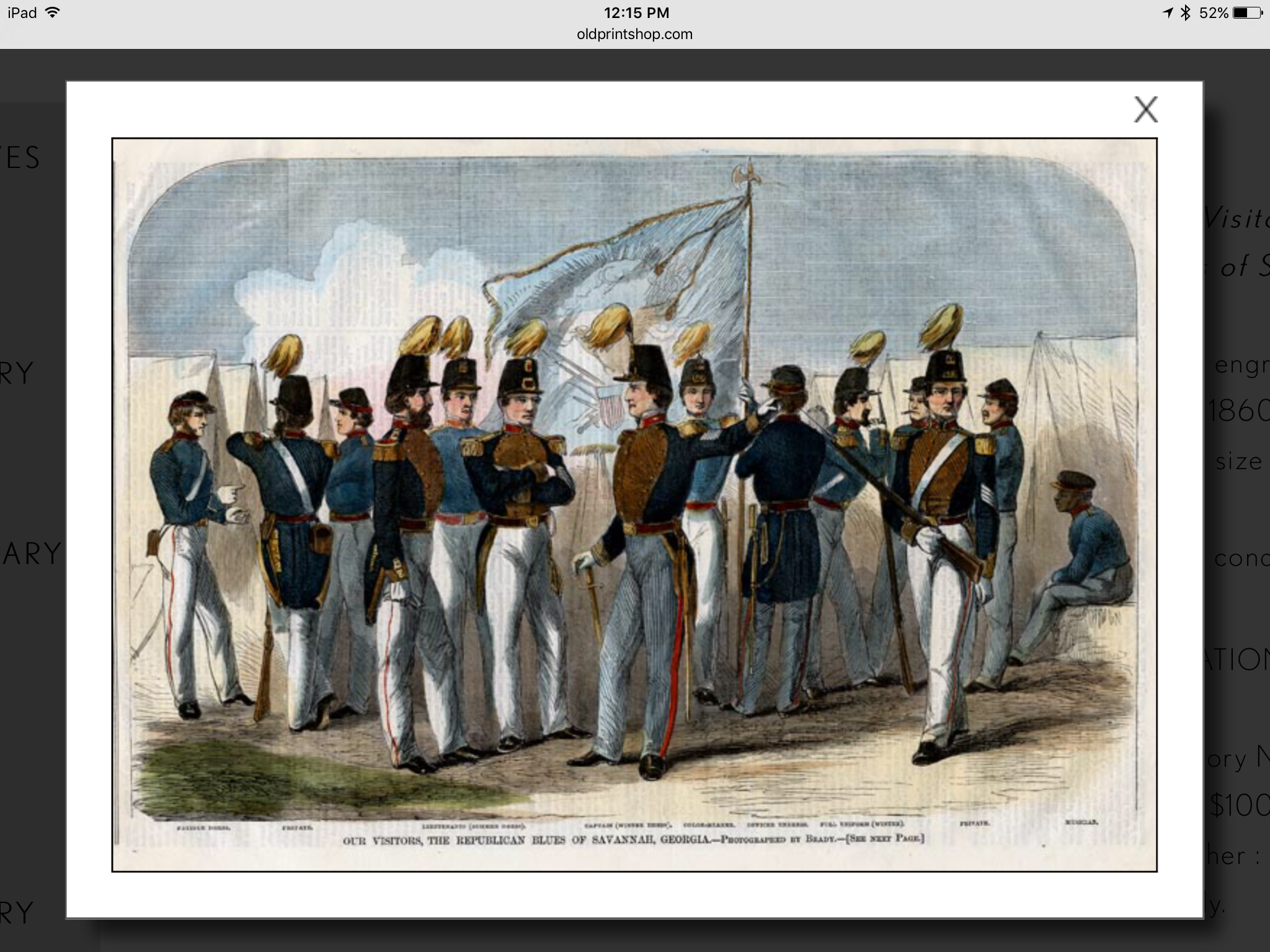
Republican Blues in 1860

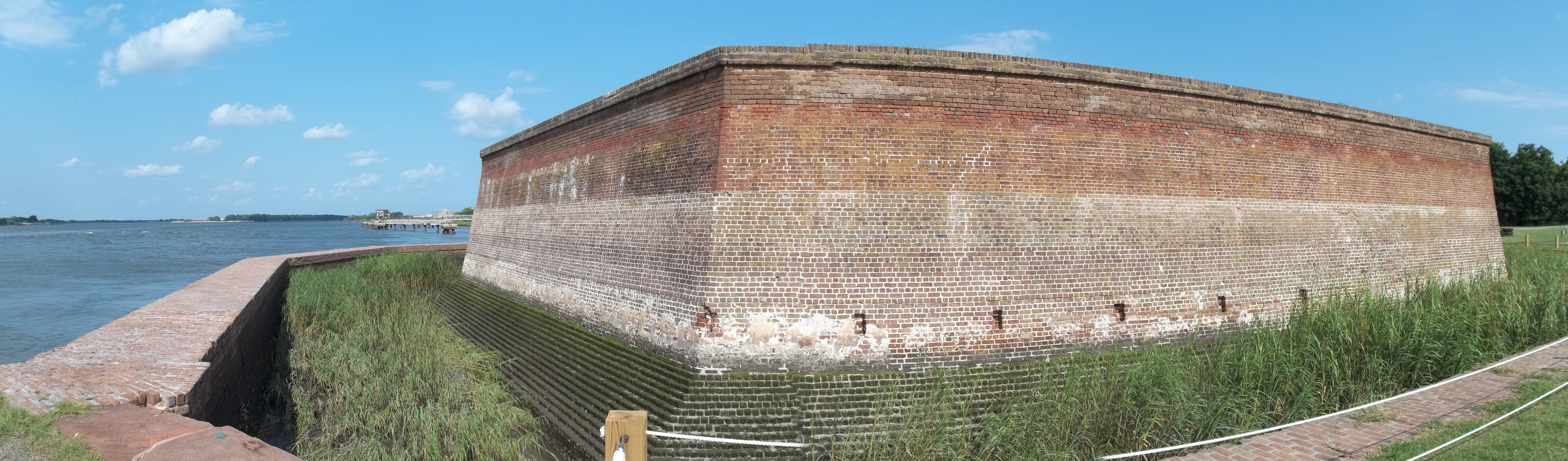
GA Savannah Fort Jackson pano01

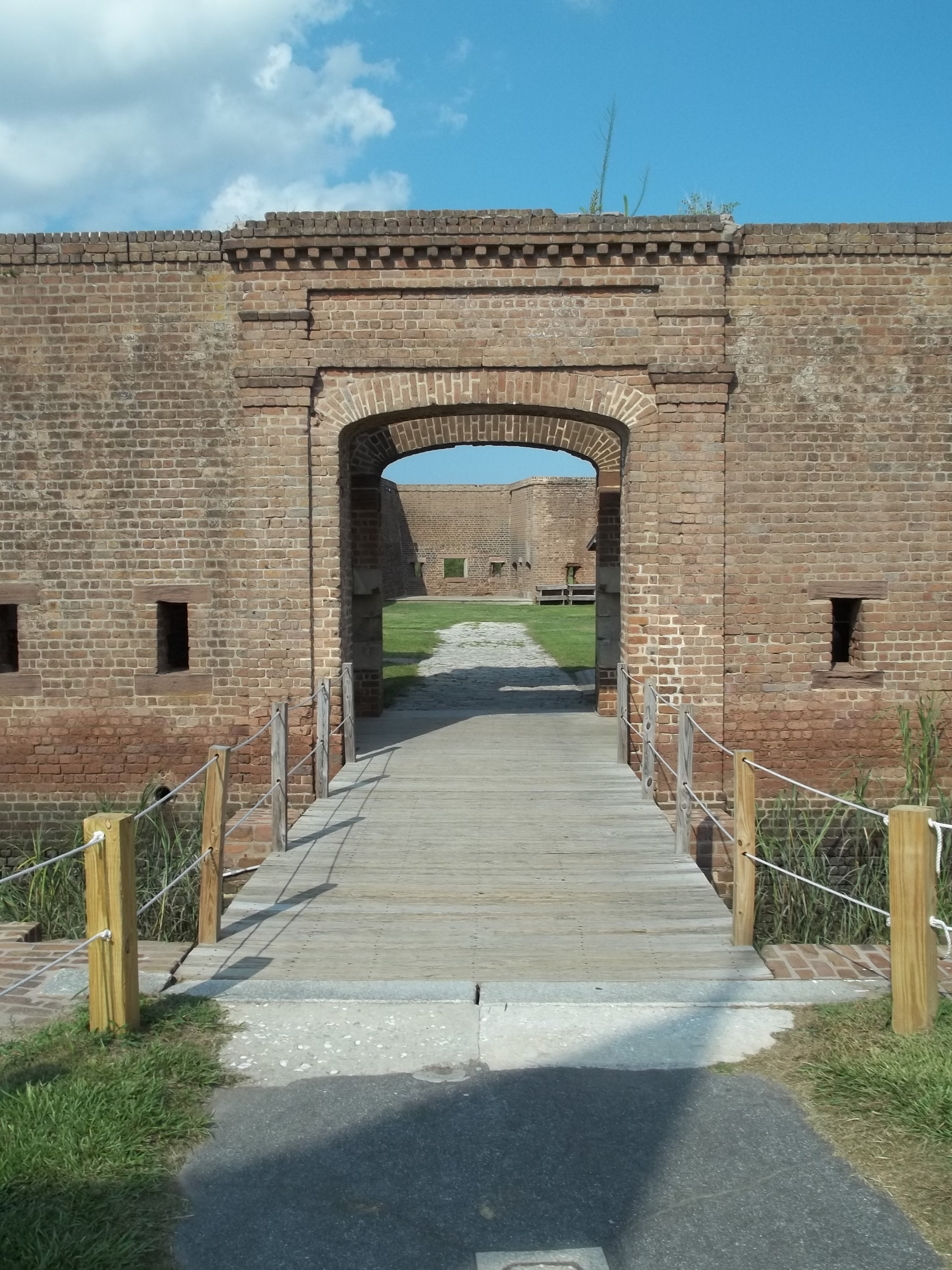
GA Savannah Fort Jackson gate01

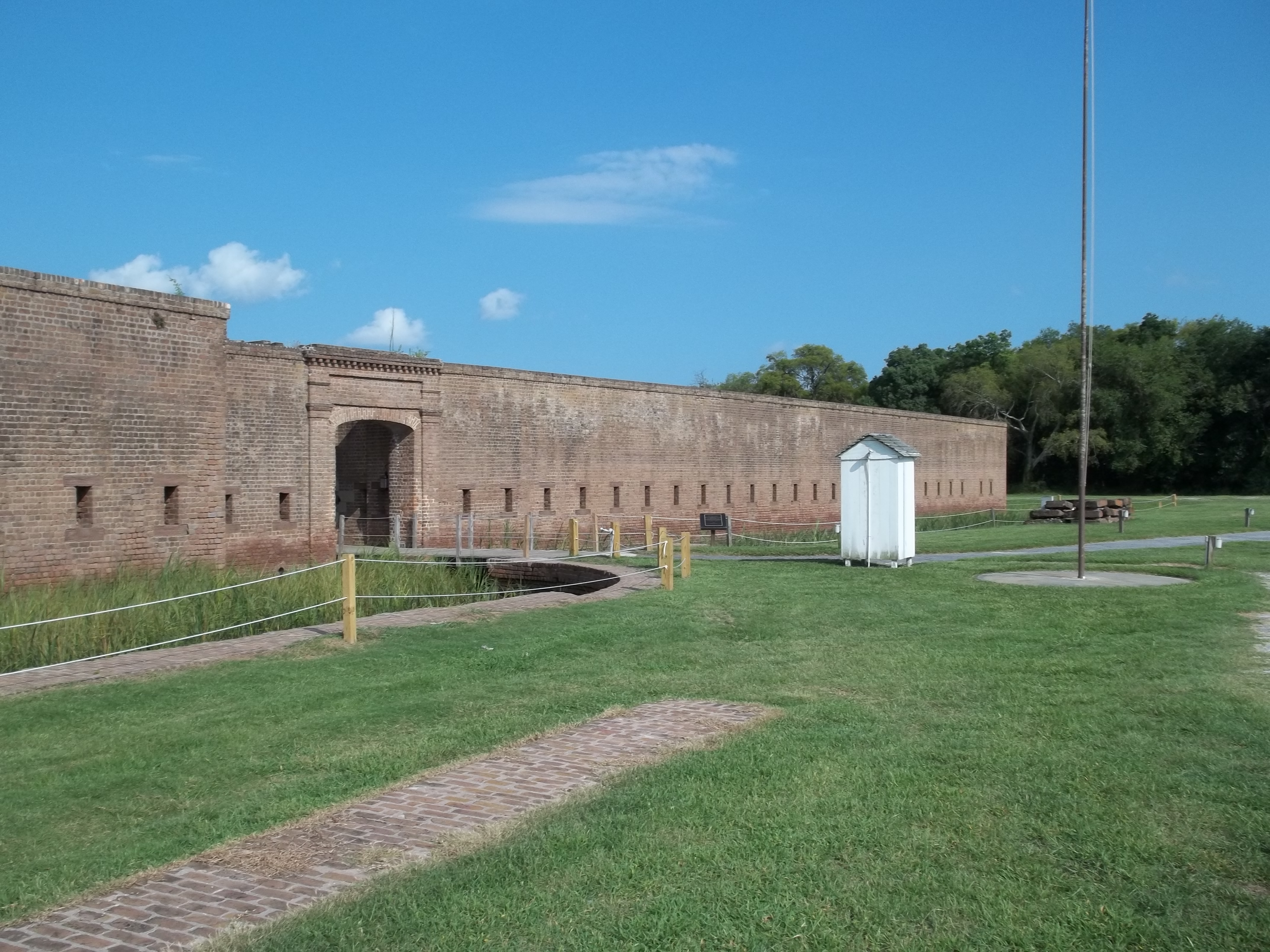
GA Savannah Fort Jackson04

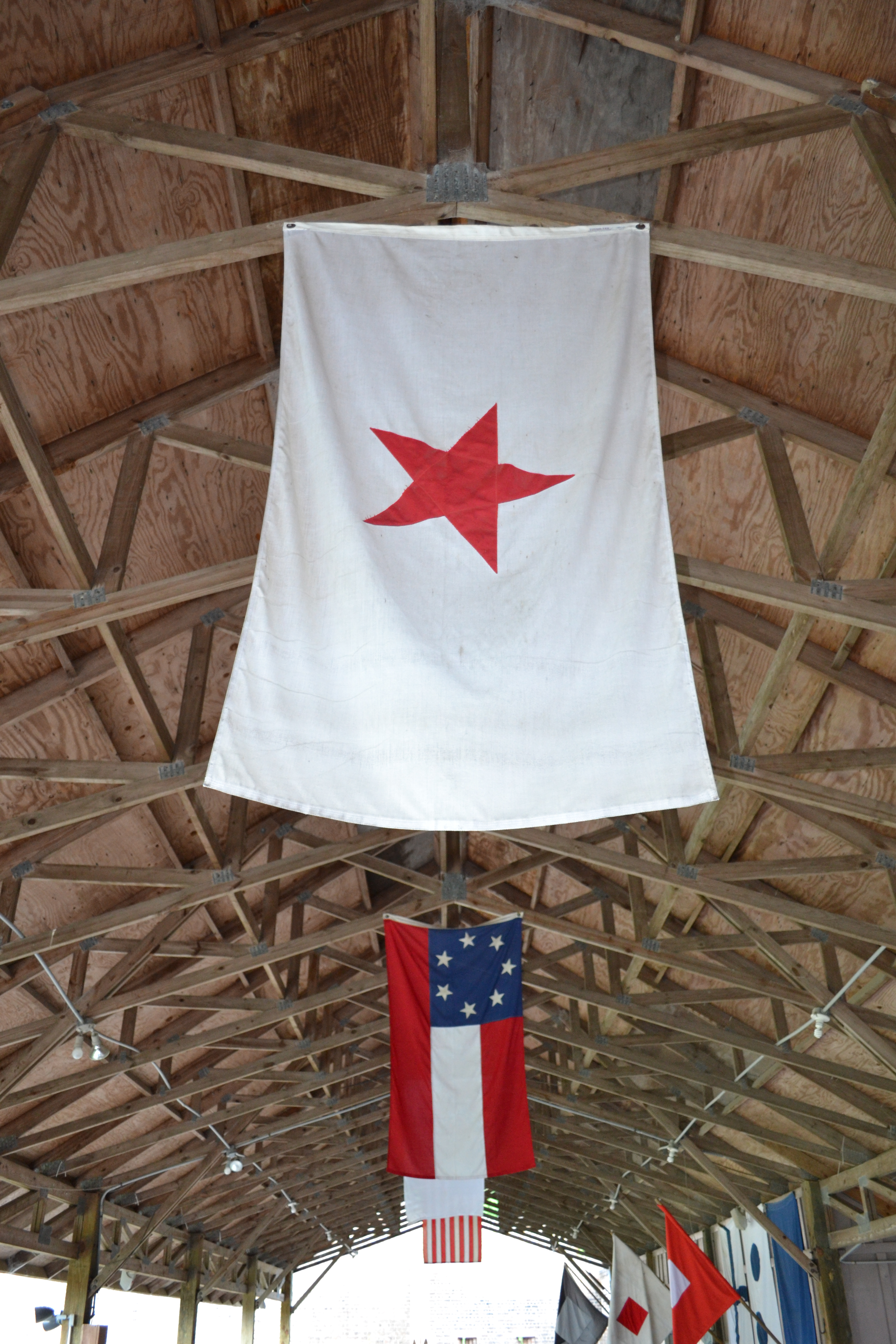
Georgia Flag at Fort James Jackson

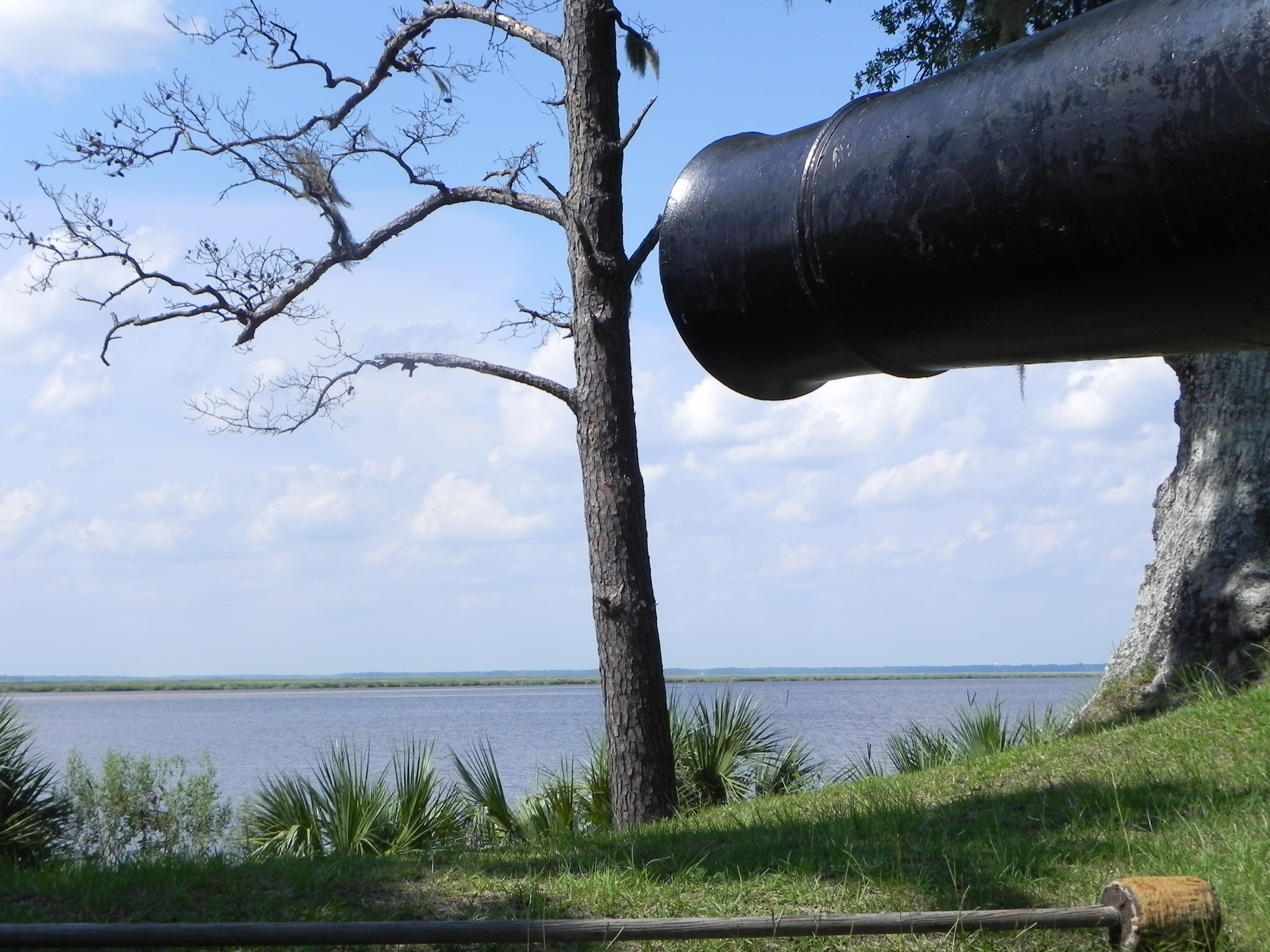
Fort McAllister Now 01

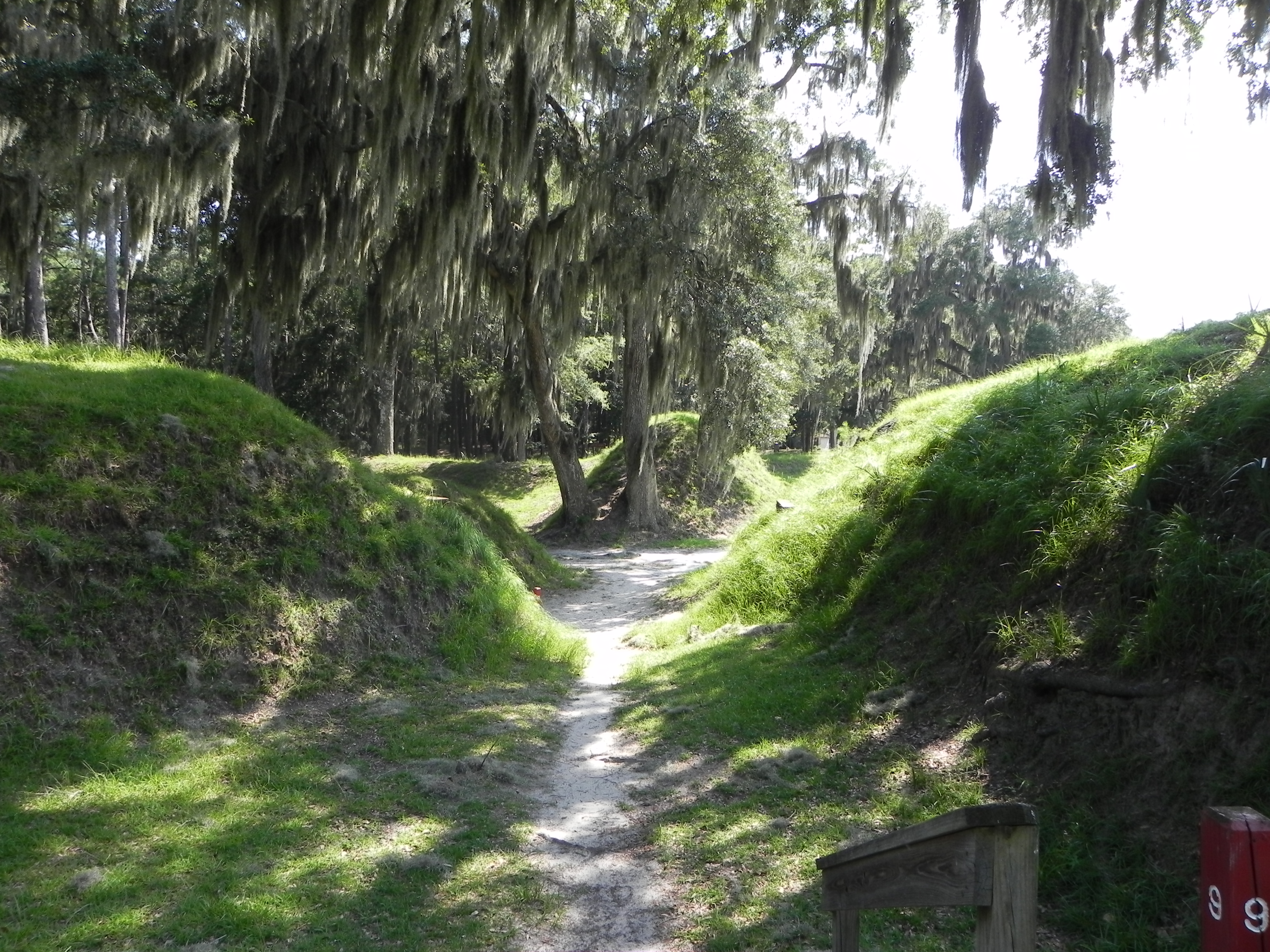
Fort McAllister Now 04

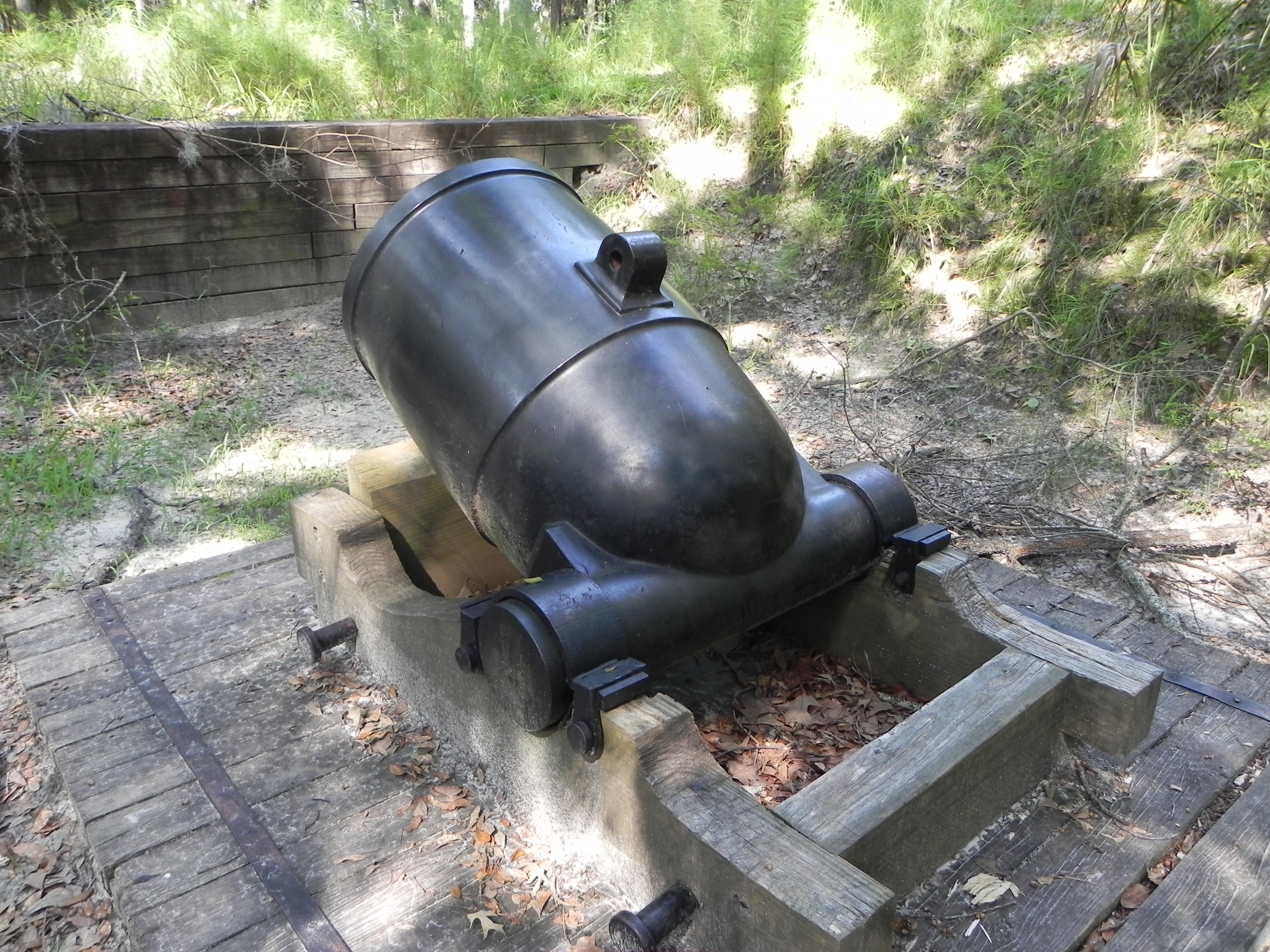
Fort McAllister Now 08

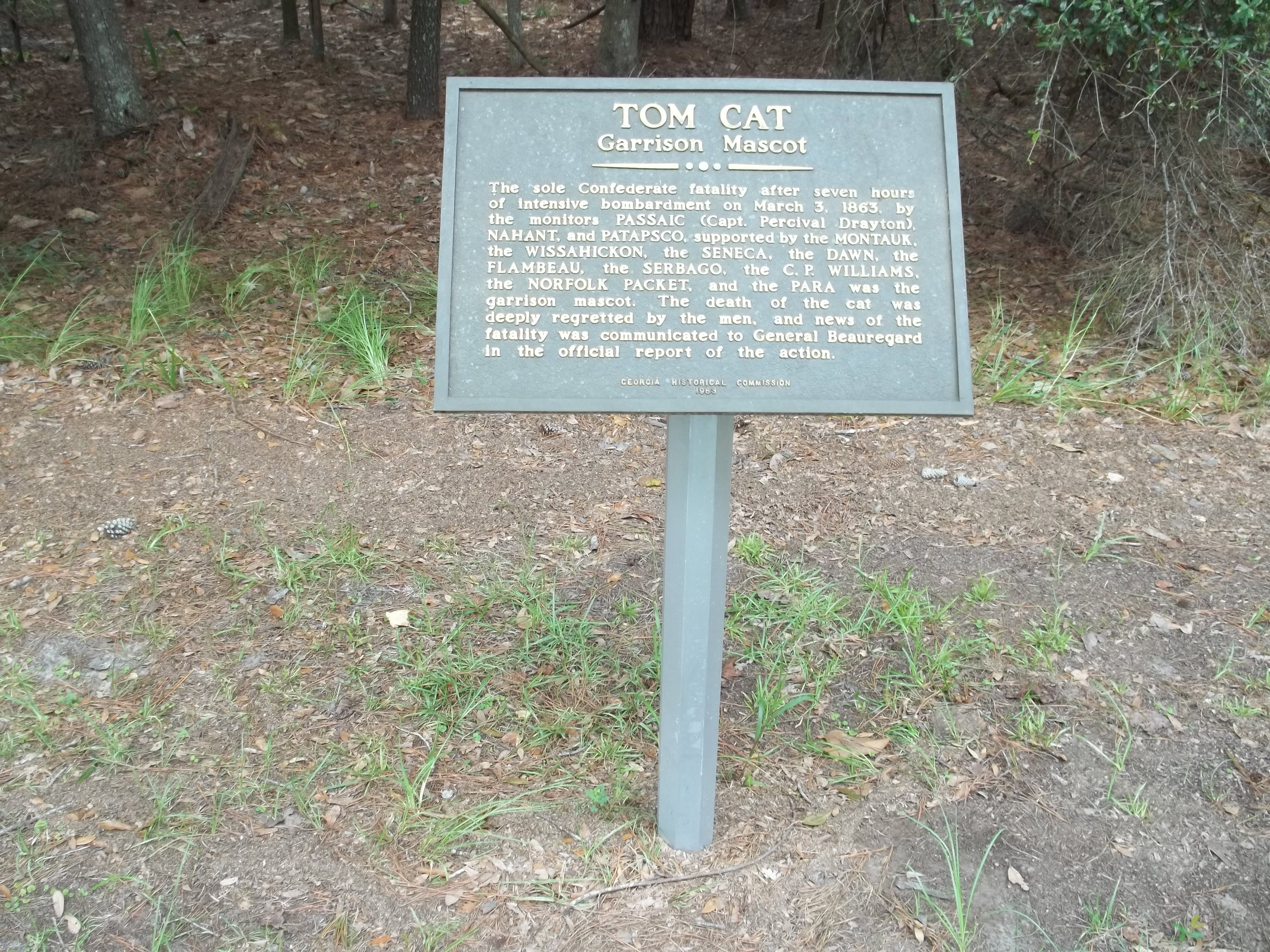
GA Richmond Hill Fort McAllister Tom Cat marker01

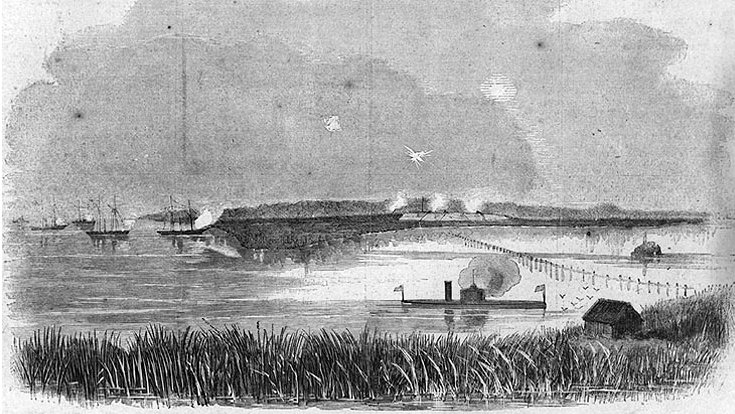
USS Montauk Attacks Fort McAllister

== See also ==
- George Anderson Mercer, Savannah politician who served with the Republican Blues
