= Battle of Noonday Creek =

Battle of the American Civil War

- Part of the American Civil War
Date	June 10, 1864-July 3, 1864 (3 weeks and 2 days)
Location	Cobb County, Georgia
Result	Confederate victory

Belligerents
United States (Union)	(Confederate States of America) CSA (Confederacy)

Commanders and leaders
William T. Sherman; Kenner Garrard	Joseph Wheeler

Strength
5 Brigades	4,500

The Battle of Noonday Creek was a series of combat events in the Atlanta campaign of the American Civil War that took place between June 10 and July 3 of 1864.

Brigadier General Kenner Garrard was ordered by Major General William Tecumseh Sherman to interpose between Major General Joseph Wheeler's Confederate cavalry and detached infantry at Noonday Creek, which was just a few miles from Sherman's headquarters at Big Shanty. When, after a week, Garrard failed to do so, two brigades of infantry and three brigades of cavalry with artillery support were advanced against the Confederate positions on June 9. Two charges failed, and the Union Army retired from the field. However, Wheeler's cavalry was moved to a position between Bell's Ferry and Canton Road.

On June 10, the 17th Indiana Infantry Regiment pushed the enemy across Noonday Creek after heavy fighting.

On June 15, a division of Union cavalry attacked and was repelled. On June 17, the Federals pushed Wheeler down Bell's Ferry Road, where he retired to Robert McAffee's house located at the intersection of today’s Barret Parkway and Bells Ferry Roads. This location is often confused with the house of Doctor John McAfee, which was located at the intersection of the Canton and Marietta Road, and the Old Alabama Road in Woodstock. On June 10 Colonel Robert H. G. Minty’s First Cavalry Brigade (U.S.) consisting of the 4th U.S. Cavalry, 4th Michigan Cavalry, and 7th Pennsylvania Cavalry Regiments, and the Chicago Board of Trade Battery crossed Noonday Creek on the Old Alabama Road, and proceeded to McAfee’s Crossroads, where Doctor McAfee’s Home was located. Upon approaching the crossroads the 7th Pennsylvania became heavily engaged, but drove in the Rebel pickets, and occupied the crossroads. While Minty was deploying his line he was attacked by two brigades of Major General William T. Martin’s division, and the entire division of Wheeler's cavalry. After fighting for about an hour the 7th Pennsylvania made a saber charge, and drove the Confederates south on the Canton and Marietta Road for a mile, until they entrenched on the crest of a hill. After an unsuccessful assault on that position, Minty withdrew back across Noonday Creek on the Old Alabama Road. Minty’s Brigade remained in position near McAfee’s Crossroads skirmishing daily with Wheeler’s Confederate Cavalry until June 20.

On June 19, the Union Army attacked but was driven off with heavy losses.

On June 23, Colonel Eli Long, USA, crossed Noonday Creek with his brigade. He was attacked at that time, and repelled the attackers.

The 4th Michigan Cavalry was attacked by 4,500 of Wheeler's cavalry at Latimar's Mill on Little Noonday Creek near Noonday Church.

== Since the Civil War ==
Despite land development since the 1980s in the area near Town Center at Cobb, the McAfee house (and a historical marker at the street) was removed from Bells Ferry Road, on the northwest corner of what is now the intersection with Barrett Parkway in 2025 (west) and Piedmont Road (east). (34.0141°N 84.5488°W)

== Units ==
=== Union Army ===
- 103rd Illinois Volunteer Infantry Regiment
- 40th Illinois Volunteer Infantry Regiment
- 6th Iowa Volunteer Infantry Regiment
- 46th Ohio Infantry
- 97th Regiment Indiana Infantry
- 4th Michigan Cavalry
- 17th Indiana Veteran Volunteer Infantry Regiment
- 7th Pennsylvania Cavalry
- 4th U.S. Cavalry
- Chicago Board of Trade Artillery

=== Confederate Army ===
- Kentucky 15th Cavalry Regiment
- Confederate 1st Cavalry Regiment
- 5th Georgia Cavalry
- Company I, 37th. Alabama Regiment

== Notes ==
For the casualties at the Battle of Noonday Creek: http://saportareport.com/noonday-creek-trail-nearing-completion-in-northern-cobb-county/

History of the 7th Pennsylvania Cavalry Minty and the Cavalry
