= Georgia Hussars =

- 108th Cavalry Regiment Distinctive Unit Insignia
- Active: 13 February 1736 –
- Country: (Kingdom of Great Britain) Province of Georgia; United States of America; Confederate States of America
- Allegiance: Georgia
- Branch: Confederate States Army; United States Army; Georgia National Guard
- Type: Cavalry
- Size: Company
- Engagements: War of Jenkins' Ear: Bloody Marsh; American Revolutionary War: Siege of Savannah; American Civil War; Border War; World War I World War II; Korean War; Vietnam War; Bosnian War; Iraq War; War in Afghanistan; War on terror

Commanders
- Notable commanders: Noble Jones; William Washington Gordon; Robert H. Anderson; Marvin Griffin

The Georgia Hussars are a cavalry unit founded before the American Revolution that continues today as part of the Georgia National Guard. The Hussars served the State of Georgia as part of the Confederate States Army during the American Civil War, and after reconciliation served in Mexico, World War I, World War II, Korea, Vietnam, Desert Storm, Bosnia and Herzegovina, and the war on terror.

== History ==
General James Oglethorpe organized the Georgia Hussars in 1736, to protect the newly established colony of Georgia. The Georgia Hussars fought in all of America's wars, including the American Civil War. Immediately after the War of 1812, the Chatham Light Dragoons and the Chatham Hussars merged into the Georgia Hussars. They volunteered for service in the Indian War of 1835–1836, and for the war with Mexico. They remained a cavalry regiment from their founding until 1940, and they continue serving Georgia today as part of the Georgia National Guard.

== American Civil War ==
The Hussars were part of a volunteer force commanded by Colonel Alexander R. Lawton that took Fort Pulaski under orders from Georgia Governor Joseph E. Brown. This was the first major act of rebellion in Georgia. In December 1861, the Hussars were stationed just outside Manassas, Virginia. At the end of August 1863, the Hussars were sent to South Carolina as part of the 5th Georgia Cavalry and assigned to the overall command of General P. G. T. Beauregard. They fought at Johns Island, Charleston, Green Pond, and many other battles within the area. The Hussars remained in South Carolina until orders sent them back to Savannah on May 13, 1864; along the way, those orders changed and the 5th Georgia Cavalry rode to join General Joseph Wheeler and the Army of Tennessee. Once they had joined Wheeler's forces, the troops traveled to Atlanta. They participated in the battle for that city and in the greater Atlanta campaign, where they lost many men. They saw combat in several major subsequent actions, including Kennesaw Mountain, Buckhead, Big Shanty, Chattahoochee River, and Decatur. Their last documented skirmish was the Battle of Morrisville Station on April 13–14, 1865. The regiment surrendered in Hillsboro, North Carolina on April 26, 1865.

=== Companies of the Fifth Georgia Cavalry ===
- A – "Georgia Hussars" (Chatham County)
- B – "Chatham Light Horse" (Chatham County)
- C – "Blue Cap Cavalry" (Burke County)
- D – "Liberty Guards" (Liberty County)
- E – "Bulloch Troop" (Bulloch County)
- F – "Screven Troop" (Screven County)
- G – "Liberty Independent Troop" (Liberty County)
- H – "Mounted Rifles" (Chatham County)
- I – "Effingham Hussars" (Effingham County)
- K – "McIntosh Light Dragoons" (McIntosh County)

== Post-American Civil War service ==
At the end of the Civil War, an Act by the Congress of the United States approved on March 2, 1867, disbanded all militias of the southern states. While the military existence of the Hussars was suspended until May 23, 1872, most members of the unit formed a civilian organization called the 'Savannah Sabre Club'. This quasi-military civic organization held parades, marksmanship competitions, and social events until they were able to resume military service. Upon the resumption of military service in 1872 the members of the Sabre Club were absorbed back into the Georgia Hussars.

In 1875, the Hussars became Troop A, 1st Squadron of Cavalry and held the designation until 1889 when they were re-designated Troop A, 1st Cavalry Regiment. In 1907, they reverted to Troop A, 1st Squadron of Cavalry. The Hussars traveled to the Mexican Border in 1916, then served briefly in World War I as part of the "Dixie Division", serving as Headquarters Troop, 31st Division. The division was organized at Camp Wheeler in August 1917 (National Guard Division from Alabama, Florida and Georgia). It comprised the 61st Infantry Brigade and the 62nd Infantry Brigade, with four infantry regiments (121st, 122nd, 123rd and 124th) between them.

The Hussars went overseas in September 1918. Upon arrival in France, the 31st was designated as a replacement division. The personnel of most of the units were withdrawn and sent to other organizations as replacements for combat casualties. The remaining personnel were demobilized at Camp Gordon in January 1919.

Following the Great War, in 1921 the unit became part of the 108th Cavalry (Troop A) until World War II when the unit was designated as Battery A, 101st Battalion of Coastal Artillery – Anti Aircraft. Future Georgia Governor Marvin Griffin was their Battalion Commander at that time.

== Contemporary service ==
Today the Georgia Hussars continue on as part of the 108th Cavalry of the Georgia National Guard. While deployed in support of Operation Enduring Freedom, the 1-108th participated in training the Afghan Security Forces while conducting Counter Insurgency Operations throughout the country.

== Gallery ==
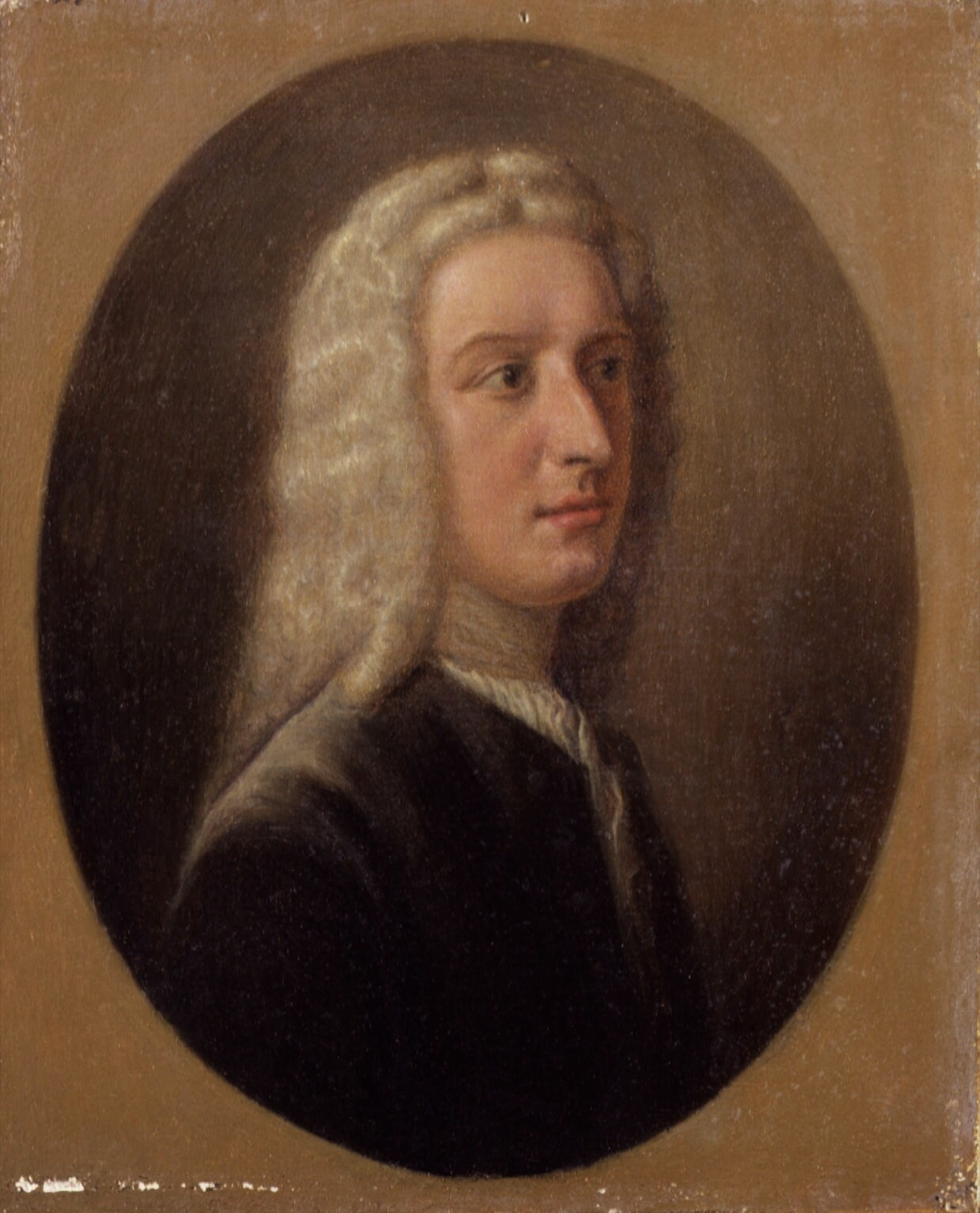
James Edward Oglethorpe by Alfred Edmund Dyer

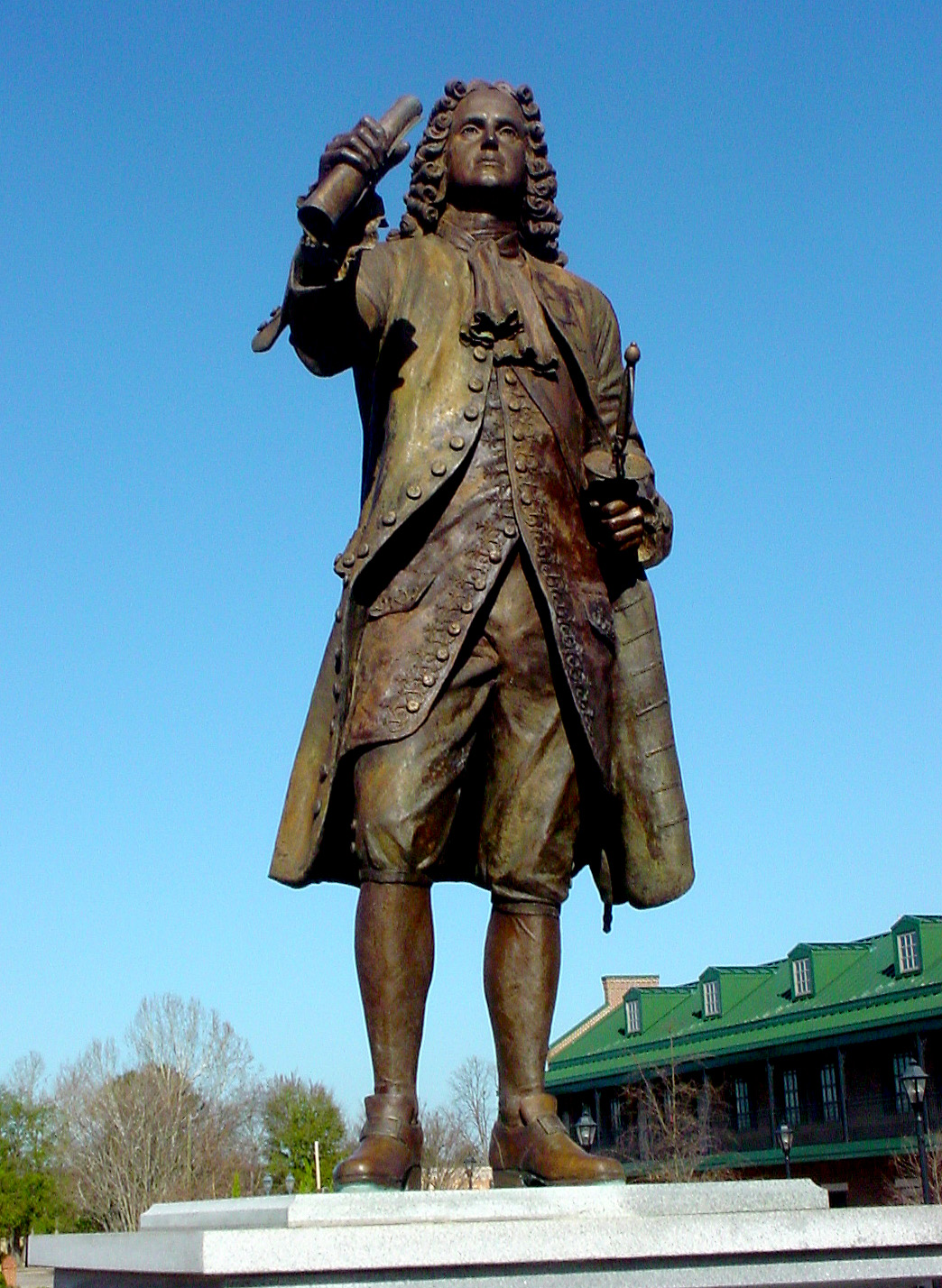
James Oglethorpe Statue in Augusta GA

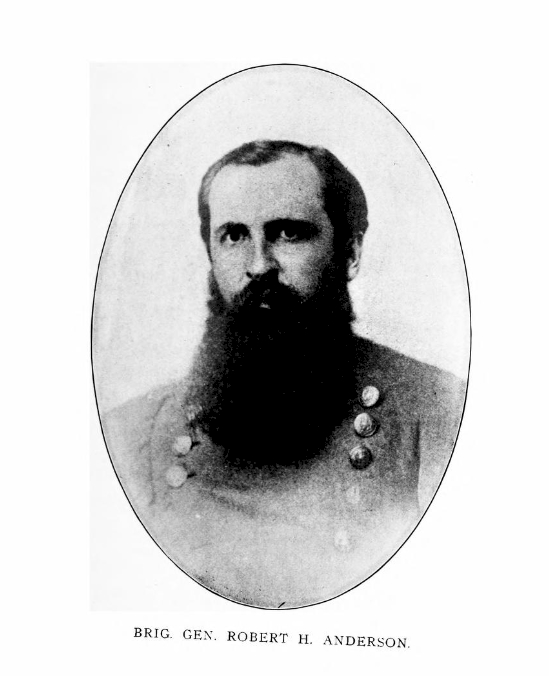
BG Robert H. Anderson, 1864

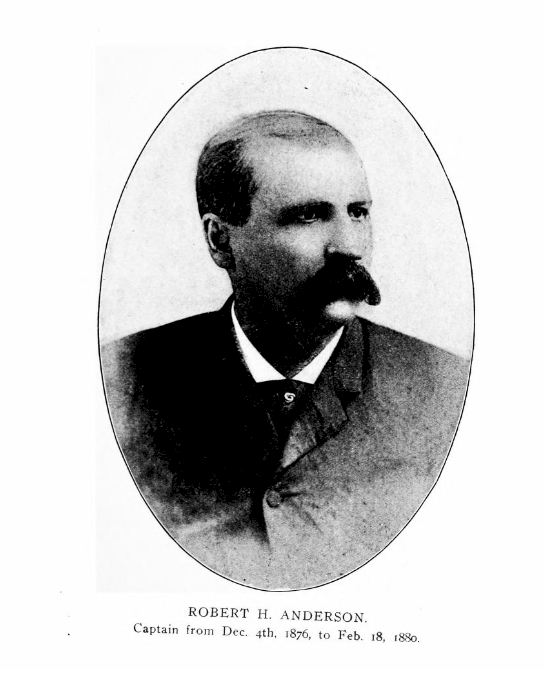
Robert H. Anderson, 1880

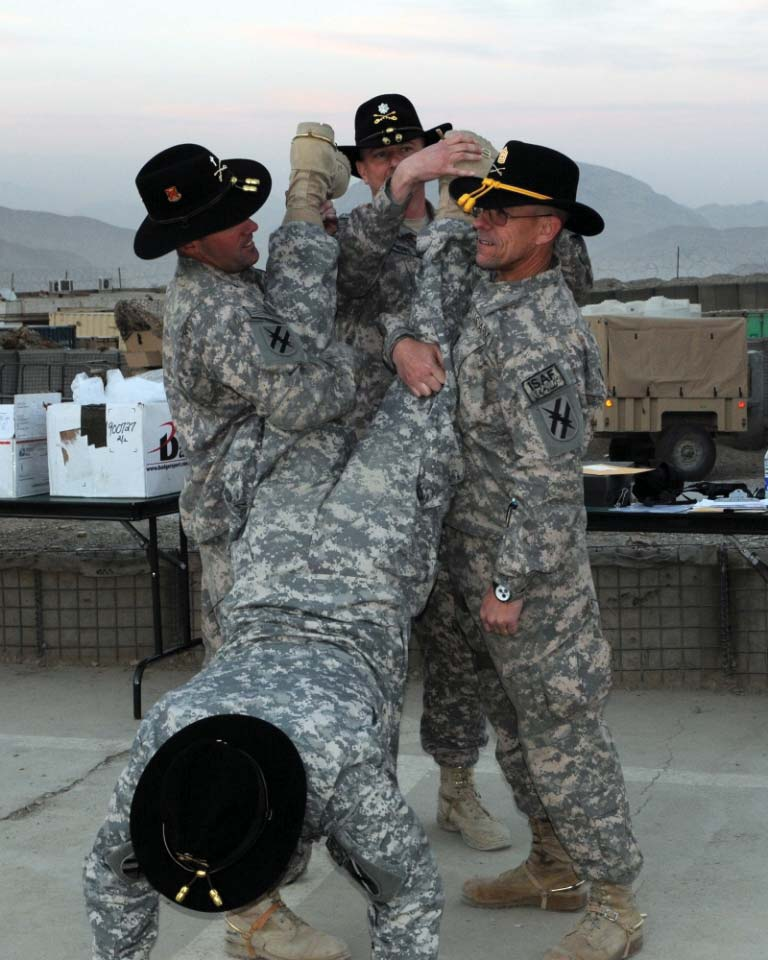
A trooper from the 1st Squadron, 108th Cavalry receives his golden spurs as part of the 'Roughriders' New Year's celebration event at FOB Torkham, Afghanistan. Golden spurs are awarded to Cavalry Troopers for service with a Cavalry unit in a combat zone.

== See also ==
- List of Civil War regiments from Georgia
