= First Battle of Fort McAllister =

Battle of the American Civil War

Coordinates: 31.89009°N 81.19738°W

- Part of the American Civil War
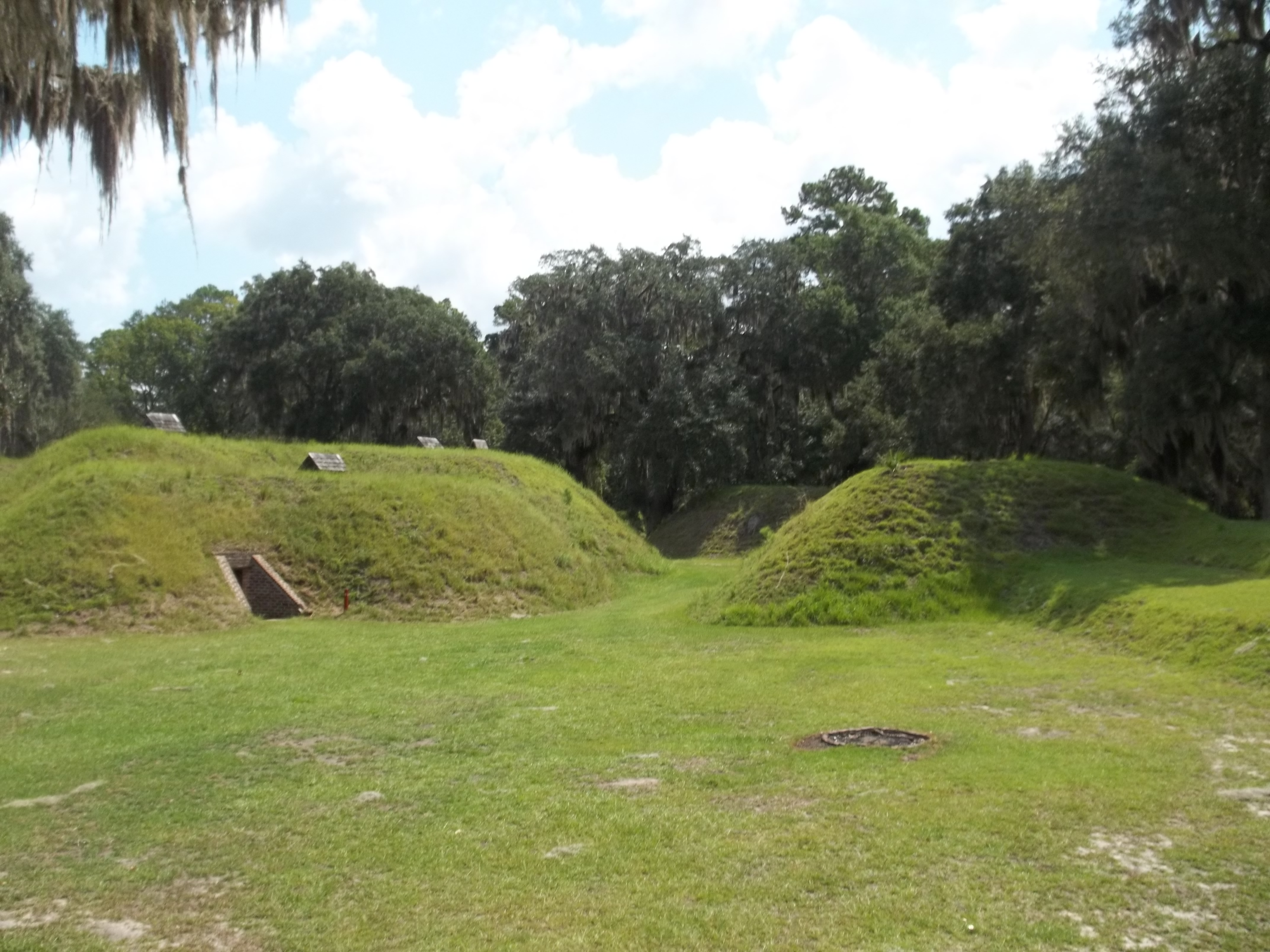
- GA Richmond Hill Fort McAllister inside
Date	January 27, 1863 – March 3, 1863
Location	Bryan County, Georgia
Result	Confederate victory

Belligerents
United States (Union)	(Confederate States of America) CSA (Confederacy)

Commanders and leaders
Capt. Percival Drayton; Cdr. John L. Worden; Cdr. Daniel Ammen	Maj. John B. Gallie †; George Wayne Anderson

Units involved
U.S.S Montauk; U.S.S Patapsco; U.S.S Passaic; U.S.S Nahant	Fort McAllister Garrison- Emmett Rifles; Georgia Sharpshooters; Republican Blues; Chatham Artillery

Casualties and losses
Unknown	Unknown

The First Battle of Fort McAllister was a series of naval attacks that took place from January 27 to March 3, 1863, at Fort McAllister in Bryan County, Georgia, during the American Civil War. The commander of the South Atlantic Blockading Squadron Rear Adm. Samuel F. Du Pont decided to test operation of new monitors against Fort McAllister before conducting a major naval operation against Charleston, South Carolina.

== Earlier operations ==
Fort McAllister was a small earthen fort located along Genesis Point and armed with several heavy cannon to defend the Great Ogeechee River approach south of Savannah, Georgia. It was expanded repeatedly by adding more guns, traverses and bombproofs. Obstructions and eventually torpedoes (mines) completed the riverine defenses.

In July 1862 the blockade runner Nashville ran up the river to escape blockaders, and would remain trapped. Learning that the Nashville was lying near the fort, Adm. Du Pont ordered Commander Charles Steedman to make a "reconnaissance in force" and to destroy the fort if possible. At this time the garrison was commanded by Capt. Alfred L. Hartridge of Co. A., 1st Georgia Volunteer Infantry, the "DeKalb Riflemen." The main battery consisted of five 32-pounder and one 42-pounder smoothbore. On July 29, Steedman led the wooden gunboats USS Paul Jones, Unadilla, Huron and Madgie against the work in a 90-minute long-range exchange. Steedman found that approaching the fort would cause unacceptable losses and withdrew.

An 8" Columbiad was added to the fort in August and the garrison was replaced with the Emmett Rifles and the Republican Blues. Under Cdr. John L. Davis the Federal gunboats USS Wissahickon and Dawn and a mortar schooner engaged the fort for several hours on November 19. The fort did not reply to the initial long-range bombardment and waited until the warships ascended the river to the guns' effective range. When the lead vessels reached 3,000 yards the garrison opened fire and immediately scored a hit, holing the Wissahickon below the waterline. The Federals withdrew. Damage to the fort was minor and readily repaired and only three men were slightly wounded in the fortifications.

== Initial attacks ==
Union Navy ironclads Weehawken, Montauk and New Ironsides firing on Fort Moultrie, Sept 8, 1863

Adm. Du Pont dispatched an ironclad in an attempt to capture the fort, sink the Nashville and burn the Atlantic and Gulf railway bridge farther up the river. This would provide the first test of the new Passaic class of ironclad monitor armed with the massive new 15" Dahlgren cannon, at the time the heaviest cannon mounted on a warship. The single turret of the new class contained one 11" Dahlgren in addition to the 15". On January 27, 1863, the monitor USS Montauk, three gunboats, and a mortar schooner again engaged the fort. Commander John L. Worden of the Montauk shelled the fort for five hours at a range of 1,500-1,800 yards, penetrating and tearing up the parapets, but causing no lasting damage or casualties. Likewise, thirteen hits scored by the fort's artillery did little beside denting the monitor's plate and sink a small launch. The defenders simply repaired the damaged earthworks during the night.

On February 1, Worden tried again to silence the fort. The prior night Federal scouts had removed several mines from the channel so that the vessels could more closely approach. The Montauk spent another five hours bombarding at only 600 yards distance. The garrison commander, Maj. John B. Gallie, was killed and seven were wounded. Major George Wayne Anderson was placed in Command of the fort following the death of Major Gallie. The monitor was struck by 48 rounds and the turret jammed for a time. Following this engagement, the river defenses would be augmented with the placement of nine "Rains torpedoes" in the channel near where the Montauk had engaged the fort.

== Destruction of the Nashville/Rattlesnake ==
Unable to run the Federal blockade, the Nashville had been sold and converted into an armed commerce raider under Capt. Thomas H. Baker. It was renamed the Rattlesnake and on February 27 Baker attempted to make the open sea during rainy weather, but was deterred by a blockader. Returning, the raider ran aground on a bend upriver from the fort but still visible to the blockaders. The next morning Worden anchored the Montauk about 1,200 yards from the fort, and about equidistant to the Rattlesnake stuck in the river bend. The monitor began firing on the stranded ship and the fort fired on the ironclad in an attempt to distract the Union vessel. After only a few minutes the Montauk sent its fifth shot into the raider's hull. This and subsequent shells produced a fire and eventually explosions which destroyed the ship. The Montauk had fired fourteen rounds in all.

As the Montauk withdrew down the river, it struck a torpedo (mine). Quick action by the commander and pilot steered the vessel onto a mud bank as the tide receded, sealing the leak until repairs could be effected. Following temporary patching, the rising tide refloated the boat. Eventually the Montauk was sent to Port Royal for permanent repairs.

== The final naval battle ==
After the early engagements with the fort, Adm. Du Pont recognized that a single monitor turret lacked the rate of fire to force the capitulation of the earthen battery. He therefore ordered three ironclads—USS Patapsco, Passaic, and Nahant—to test their guns and mechanical appliances and practice artillery firing by attacking the fort. The Montauk was to be held in reserve as its 15" gun had already fired a large number of rounds and its durability was unknown at the time. Capt. Percival Drayton of the Passaic would command this expedition.

Anticipating an attack, the malleable fort was again expanded, adding a 10" Columbiad. The fort then consisted of a "32-pounder rifle" (an old 32-pounder smoothbore rifled so that it would fire an approximately 64-pound rifled bolt or somewhat lighter shell), a 10" Columbiad, an 8" Columbiad, a 42-pounder smoothbore, three 32-pounder smoothbores (one being a "hot shot" gun), and 10" mortar in a connected work. Additionally, several sharpshooters were placed in the marsh on the opposite side of the river near where the monitors were likely to station during an attack.

On March 3, 1863, the three newer ironclads conducted an eight-hour bombardment. They were supported by five gunboats and three mortar schooners held out of range of the fort's guns. Several steamers containing the 47th New York Infantry awaited nearby to occupy the fort when subdued.

The lead monitors anchored about 1,200 yards from the fort and commenced shelling as the fort attempted to target the gun ports when the turrets rotated to fire. The bombardment knocked out the 8" Columbiad, tore large holes in the face of the fort, and for a time disabled all but the 10" Columbiad, before several other guns could be returned to service.

The Confederate sharpshooters hidden in the marsh fired on Capt. Drayton and Cmdr. Miller when they emerged on the deck of the Passaic. Neither was seriously injured, and they withdrew into the vessel. Grapeshot was fired into the marsh to discourage any further sharpshooting.

While most of the damage experienced by the ironclads was the result of firing of their own cannon, the 10" Confederate mortar battery inflicted some potentially fatal damage to the Passaic. The mortar battery commander, Capt. Robert Martin, realized that explosive mortar shells would have little effect, so he filled each shell with sand instead of gunpowder, to increase its weight and density. This would result in it retaining more velocity and momentum when it struck the thinly armored deck. One of these struck and partially penetrated the ironclad, only being stopped from penetrating all the way through the vessel because it struck on a beam.

As the tide was receding and nightfall was coming, the naval vessels withdrew. Capt. Drayton attempted to prevent repair of the earthworks overnight by maintaining 13" mortar fire on the fort overnight. This prevented slave labor from conducting the repair, but it did not prevent Confederate soldiers from working. The damage had been repaired by the next afternoon, and the loss of the fort's mascot, Tom Cat, reported to General Beauregard.

The attack on the fort had failed and no further naval assaults against it were ordered. Valuable information about several deficiencies of the monitors had been revealed by the action, and efforts would be made to remedy them where possible.

== Aftermath and conclusions ==
The first test of the 15-inch Dahlgren gun and single-turret monitors against the sand parapets of Fort McAllister had revealed several things:

- The very slow rate of fire of the very large cannon in two-gun turrets resulted in little offensive power and allowed defenders time to fire against the open gun ports, then take cover. The defenders could fire several times as rapidly. Even several monitors firing at once did not create a sufficient volume of fire to suppress the battery.
- The monitors were subject to jamming of their turret rings or other mechanical failures of the guns that could take their battery out of action.
- Spalling effects of broken bolts on impact posed a hazard to the crew even though the armor prevented penetration.
- The thin monitor decks were vulnerable to plunging fire from heavy mortars.
- Earthworks could be rapidly repaired overnight or the following day so that a garrison could return to full effectiveness.
- Long-range mortar fire against a fort was so inaccurate as to be ineffective.
- Suppressing fire against earthworks would be required overnight to limit the ability to repair damage.
- Obstructions and mines prevented passage past forts, even though the monitors might be "invulnerable" to the fort's guns during the passage.
- Sand forts held up well to shelling, while mud forts did not.
- Properly constructed traverses and bombproofs prevented forts from easily being taken out of action on the flank.

Du Pont attempted to address the shortcomings as best he could while preparing for the attack on Charleston. He ordered the strengthening of the decks with additional armor. He attempted to create a "submarine torpedo exploder" on the bow of his vessels to clear mines. He added as many ironclads to the assault as possible to increase the total volume of fire against the defenses.

Adm. Du Pont's warnings and concerns about the inability of monitors to reduce earthen forts would go unheeded as he prepared the assault on Charleston harbor. The assault was a failure and an ironclad (USS Keokuk) was lost in the attempt. Du Pont accepted responsibility for the failure at Charleston by resigning.

Fort McAllister would not be subdued by naval bombardment, but would succumb to an infantry assault at the end of Sherman's March to the Sea in December 1864.

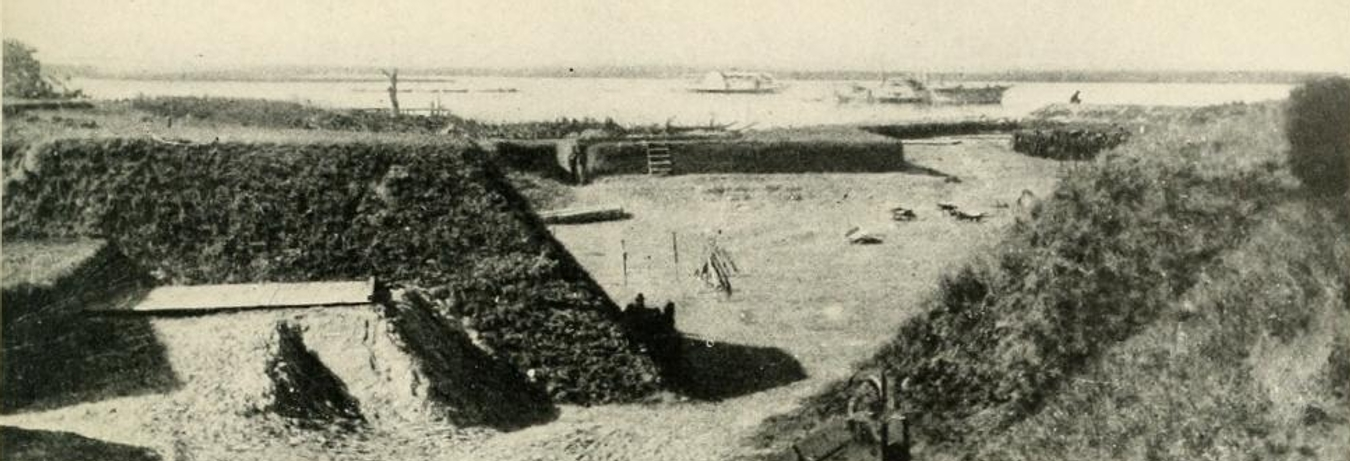
FortMcAllisterView

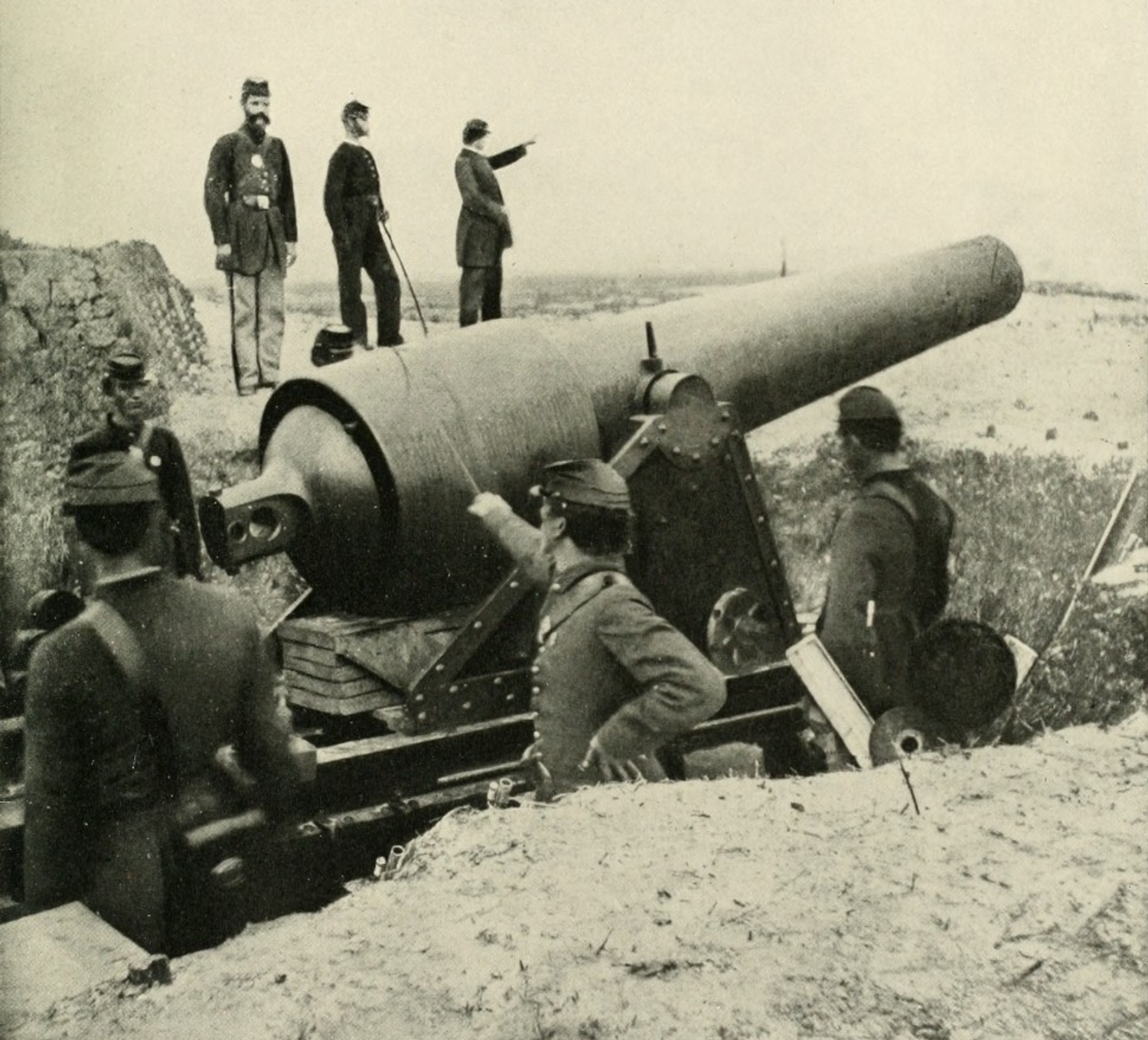
SiegeGunatFortMcAllistair1864

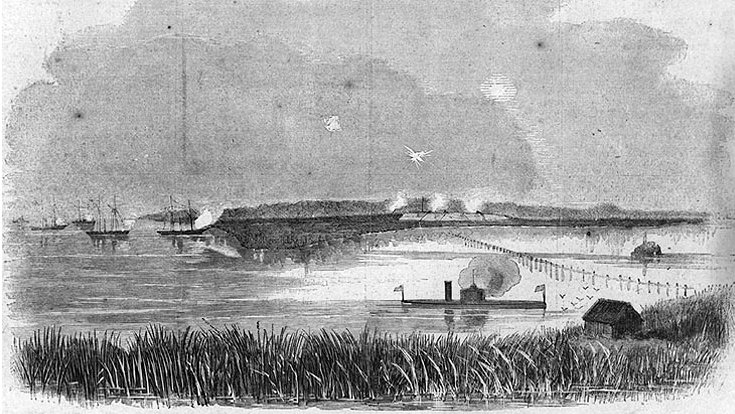
USS Montauk shells Fort McAllister

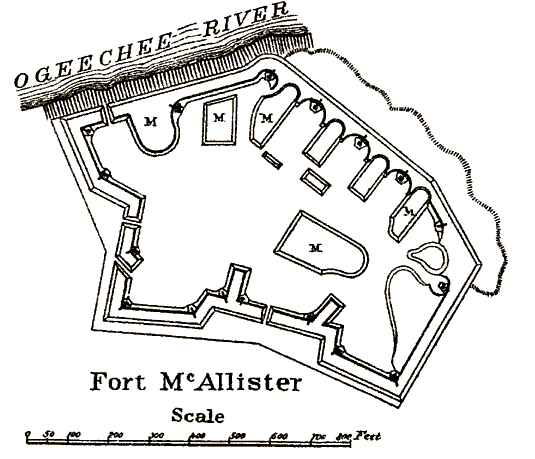
Fort McAllister Plan

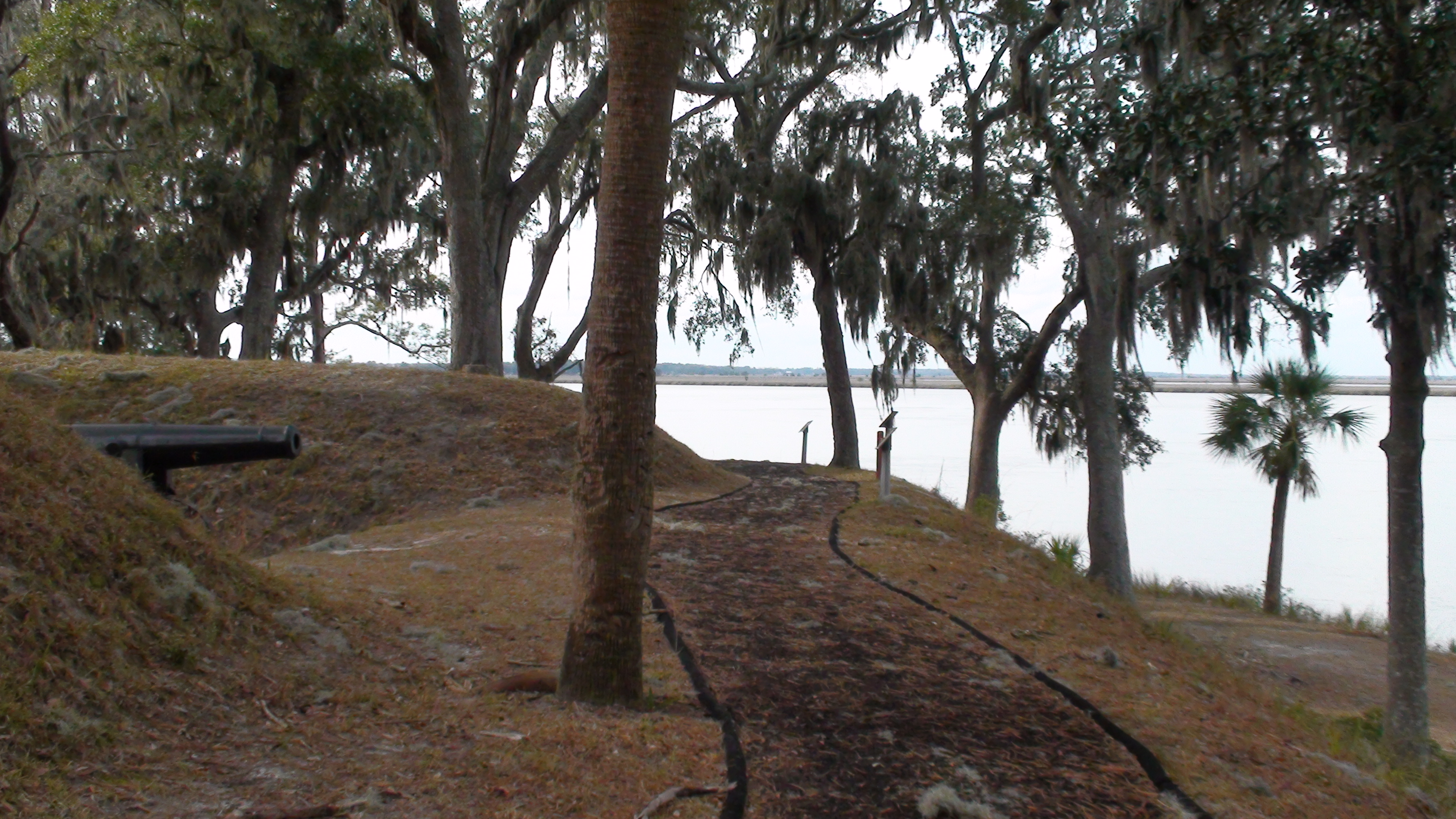
Fort McAllister 10

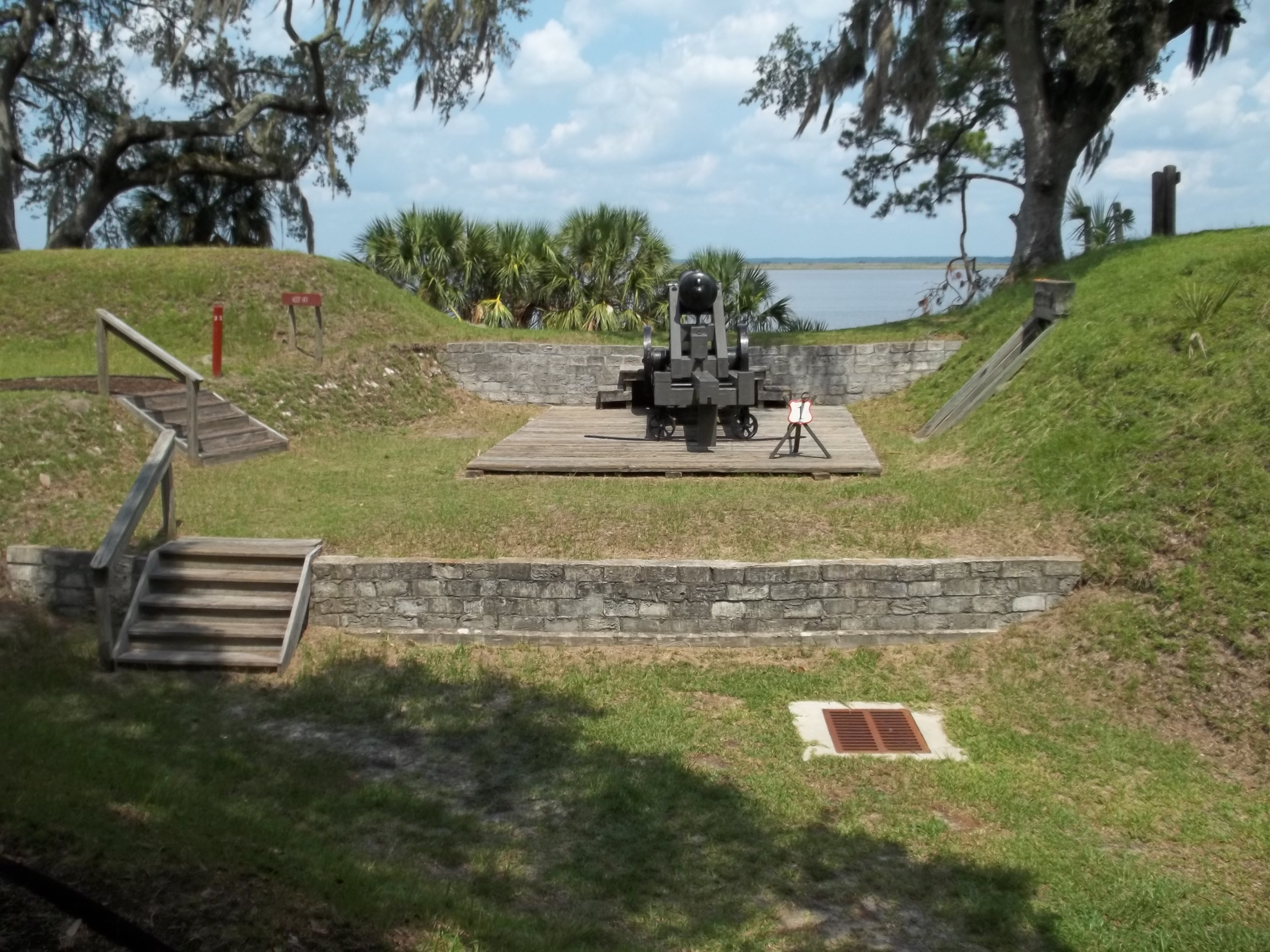
GA Richmond Hill Fort McAllister Columbiad02

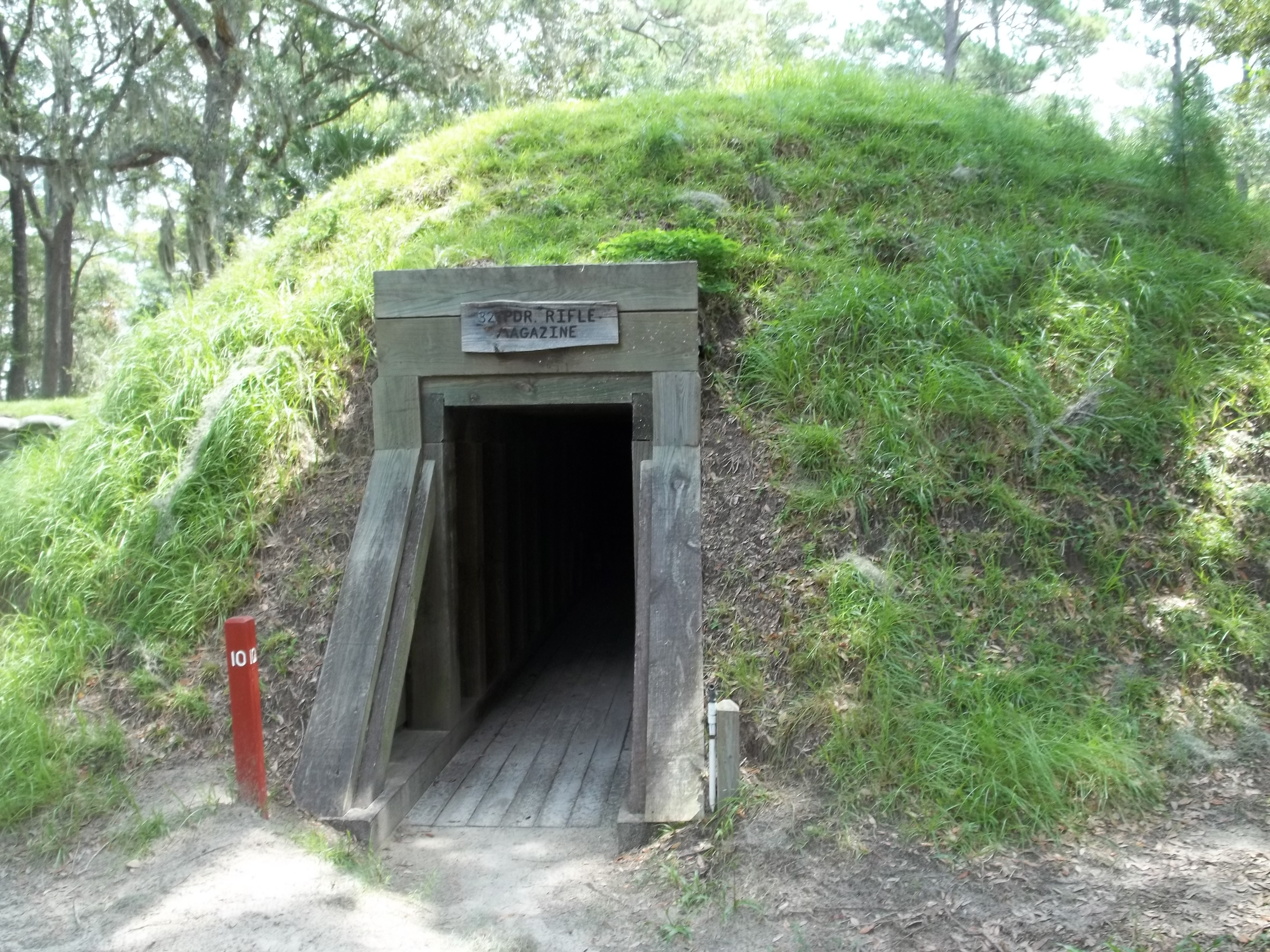
GA Richmond Hill Fort McAllister rifle mag01

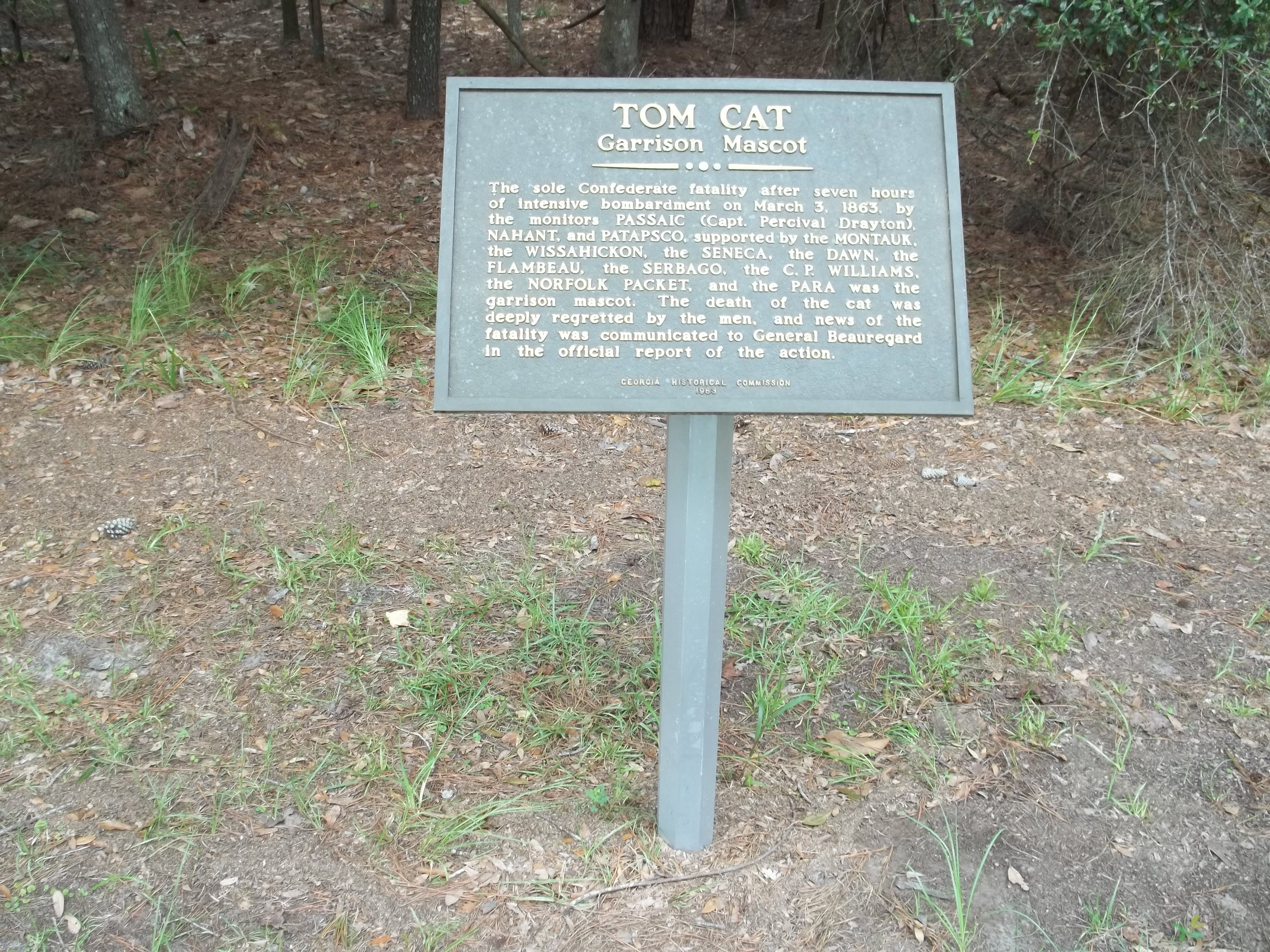
GA Richmond Hill Fort McAllister Tom Cat marker01

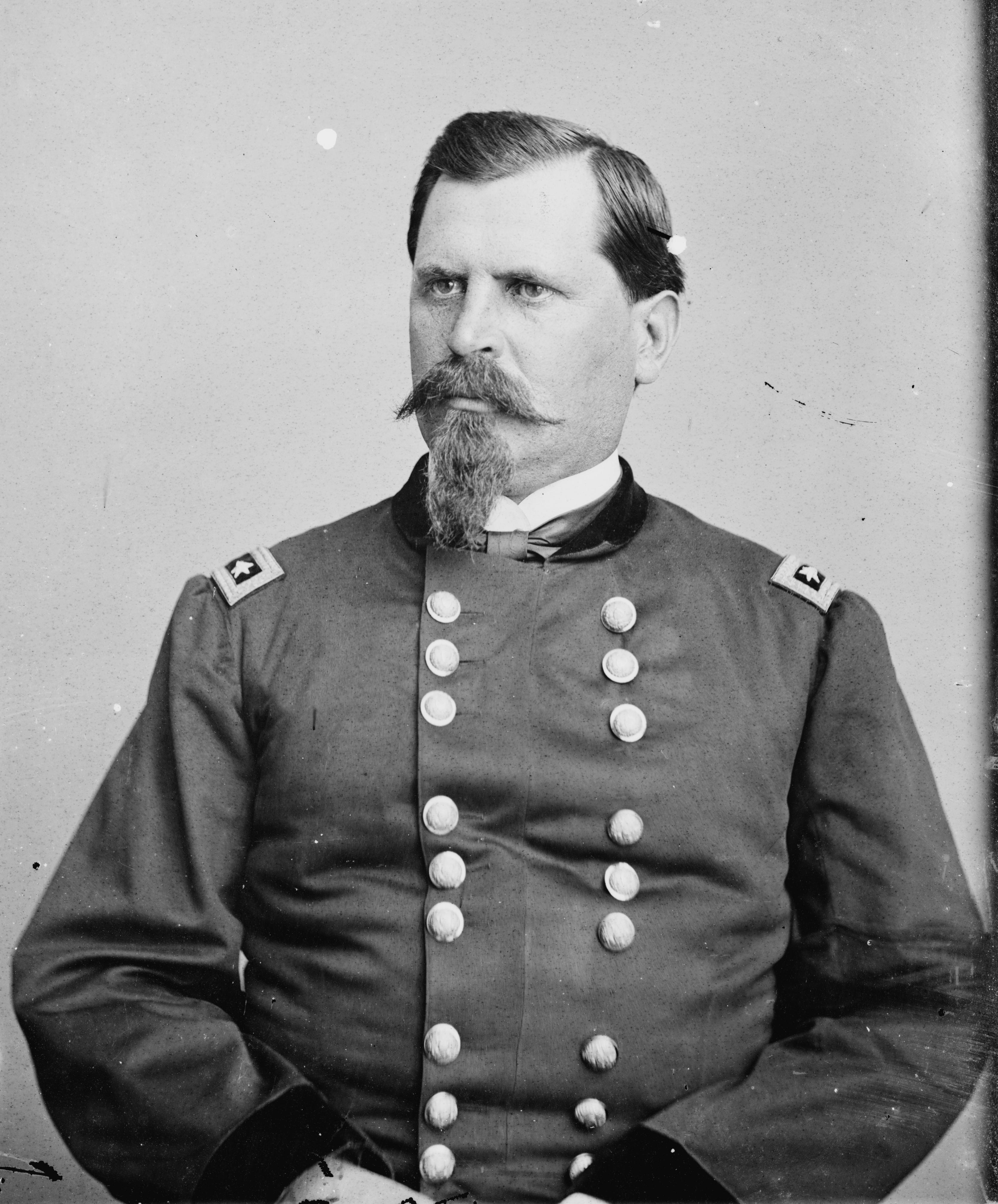
William Babcock Hazen - Brady-Handy

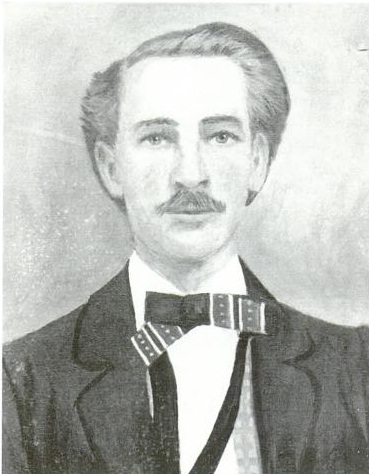
George W Anderson

== See also ==
- Second Battle of Fort McAllister
- First Battle of Charleston Harbor
