= 5th Georgia Cavalry Regiment =

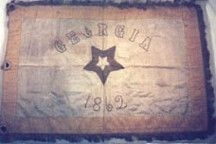
- Flag of the 5th Georgia Cavalry
- Active: January 20, 1863–April 26, 1865
- Country: Confederate States of America
- Allegiance: Georgia
- Branch: Confederate States Army
- Type: Cavalry
- Size: Regiment
- Engagements: American Civil War: Kennesaw Mountain; Atlanta campaign; Buckhead; Big Shanty; Chattahoochee River; Decatur; Morrisville Station

Commanders
- Notable commanders: Robert H. Anderson

The 5th Georgia Cavalry Regiment was a cavalry regiment in the Confederate States Army during the American Civil War. Composed of enlistees from the state of Georgia, it served entirely in the Western Theater.

== History ==
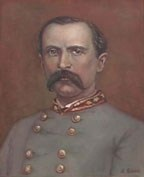
Brig. Gen. Robert H. Anderson, commander of the 5th Georgia Cavalry Regiment.

The regiment was formed on January 20, 1863, by combining the 1st Battalion, Georgia Cavalry (drawing men from Liberty and McIntosh counties) and the 2nd Battalion (Bulloch, Chatham, Effingham, and Screven counties). However, the regiment was not officially mustered into service until May 17, 1863, and was subsequently sent to South Carolina and parts of Georgia to defend against Union incursions.

In late August 1863, the regiment was sent to South Carolina and assigned to the command of General P.G.T. Beauregard. They fought at Johns Island, Charleston, Green Pond, and other engagements in the area. The 5th Cavalry remained in South Carolina until ordered back to Savannah on May 13, 1864. En route, these orders changed, and the 5th Georgia Cavalry rode to join General Joseph Wheeler and the Army of Tennessee. After joining Wheeler’s forces, the regiment traveled to Atlanta. They participated in the defense of the city and the wider Atlanta campaign, suffering significant casualties. They saw combat in several major subsequent engagements, including the Kennesaw Mountain, Buckhead, Big Shanty, Chattahoochee River, and Decatur. Their last documented skirmish was the Battle of Morrisville Station on April 13–14, 1865. The regiment surrendered in Hillsboro, North Carolina, on April 26, 1865.

James Lord Pierpont served as a private in Company H.

=== Companies of the Fifth Georgia Cavalry ===
- A - "Georgia Hussars" (Chatham County)
- B - "Chatham Light Horse" (Chatham County)
- C - "Blue Cap Cavalry" (Burke County)
- D - "Liberty Guards" (Liberty County)
- E - "Bulloch Troop" (Bulloch County)
- F - "Screven Troop" (Screven County)
- G - "Liberty Independent Troop" (Liberty County)
- H - "Mounted Rifles" (Chatham County)
- I - "Effingham Hussars" (Effingham County)
- K - "McIntosh Light Dragoons" (McIntosh County)

== See also ==
- List of Civil War regiments from Georgia
