= Battle of Morrisville =

Battle of the American Civil War

- Part of the American Civil War
Date	April 13–15, 1865
Location	Morrisville, North Carolina 35°49′39″N 78°49′44″W
Result	Union victory

Belligerents
United States	Confederate States

Commanders and leaders
(United States) Hugh Judson Kilpatrick	(Confederate States of America) Wade Hampton (Confederate States of America) Joseph Wheeler
- Location within North Carolina

The Battle of Morrisville, also known as the Battle at Morrisville Station, was fought April 13–15, 1865, in Morrisville, North Carolina during the Carolinas campaign of the American Civil War.

== Battle ==
The battle was the last official battle of the Civil War between the armies of Major General William T. Sherman and General Joseph E. Johnston. General Judson Kilpatrick, commanding officer of the Union cavalry advance, forced Confederate forces, under the command of Generals Wade Hampton III and Joseph Wheeler, to withdraw in haste. The Confederates were frantically trying to transport their remaining supplies and wounded westward, by rail, toward the final Confederate encampment in Greensboro, NC, which, unbeknownst to them, had fallen under attack by the 3rd North Carolina Mounted Infantry as part of Stoneman's Raid. Kilpatrick used artillery on the heights overlooking Morrisville Station and cavalry charges to push the Confederates out of the small village leaving many needed supplies behind. However, the trains were able to withdraw with wounded soldiers from the Battle of Bentonville and the Battle of Averasborough. Later, General Johnston sent a courier to the Federal encampments at Morrisville with a message for Major General Sherman requesting a conference to discuss an armistice. Several days later the two generals met at Bennett Place on April 17, 1865 to begin discussing the terms of what would become the largest surrender of the war.

Due to the development of the area, hardly any evidence of the battle remains. Some heavily trampled breastwork is still visible in the woods by the train tracks. The North Carolina government has installed a sign marking the approximate location of the battle.
