= Jefferson Randolph Anderson =

American lawyer (1861–1950)

Personal details
- Born: September 4, 1861 Savannah, Georgia, U.S.
- Died: July 17, 1950 (aged 88) Savannah, Georgia, U.S.
- Resting place: Bonaventure Cemetery
- Parent: Edward Clifford Anderson Jr. (father)
- Education: University of Virginia
- Occupation: Lawyer

Jefferson Randolph Anderson (September 4, 1861 – July 17, 1950) was an American lawyer who was prominent in Savannah, Georgia.

== Early life ==
Anderson was born in 1861 in Savannah, Georgia, to Edward Clifford Anderson Jr. and Jane Margaret Randolph, daughter of William Mann Randolph, granddaughter of Colonel Thomas Jefferson Randolph and great-granddaughter of U.S. President Thomas Jefferson. He was one of their five children, alongside George, Elizabeth, Margaret and Sarah.

His grandfather was George Wayne Anderson, a major in the United States Army.

Anderson attended the public schools in Savannah, graduating from Chatham County High School in 1877. He went on to study at Hanover Academy, where Colonel Hilary P. Jones was principal, until 1879. He then studied at the University of Virginia between 1879 and 1881, before studying abroad for two years at the University of Göttingen, under Professor Rudolf von Jhering. He returned to the University of Virginia, this time its law school, in 1883. He studied under Professor John B. Minor. He graduated in the summer of 1885. The previous year he had been elected the "Final President" of the Jefferson Literary Society.

== Career ==
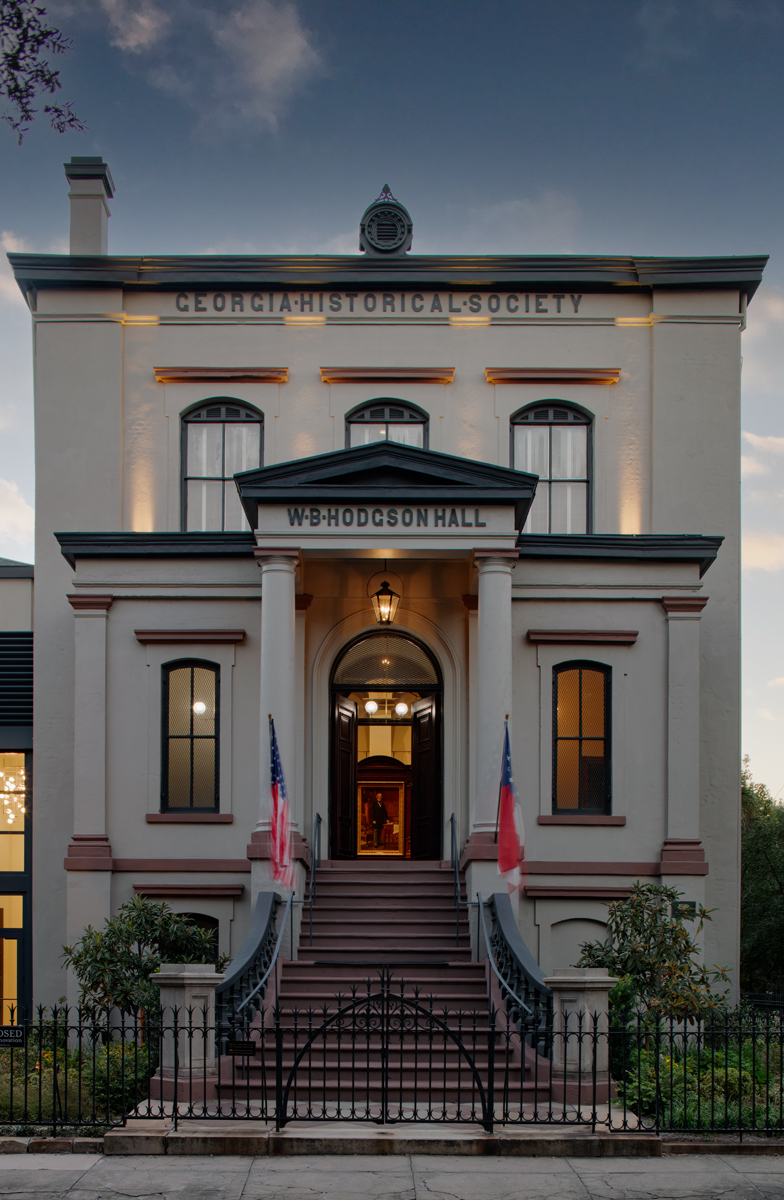
Hodgson Hall, home of the Georgia Historical Society

Anderson was admitted to the bar in Virginia but returned to his hometown of Savannah in 1885 to practice. He began in the office of Judge Walter Scott Chisholm. After taking a course in practical business at the Eastman Business College in Poughkeepsie, New York, he opened his law office in Savannah in October 1887. He became junior partners in the law firm of Charlton and (William) Mackall, which became Charlton, Mackall and Anderson. After the retirement of Charlton in 1900, the firm became Mackall and Anderson until 1902, when it was dissolved. Anderson continued alone again, before forming a partnership with Honorable George T. Cann. Honorable J. Ferris can joined in 1911, creating Anderson, Cann and Cann.

Aside from his role as a lawyer, Anderson worked for Savannah Electric and Power Company for 55 years, some of which were spent as its president. He was also president of Savannah and Statesboro Railway Company and of the Georgia and Alabama Terminal Company.

Anderson was president of the Georgia Historical Society between 1938 and 1941. He served in the Georgia House of Representatives between 1905 and 1906, between 1909 and 1910 and, finally, between 1910 and 1912.

== Personal life ==
Anderson married Anne Page Wilder, with whom he had three known children: Page, Jefferson Jr. and Joseph. Jefferson Jr. died aged fourteen months. The family summered at "Oakton", a home at the base of Kenesaw Mountain, near Marietta, Georgia.

He was a member and vice-president of Savannah's Oglethorpe Club, and was a vestryman at the city's Christ Church.

== Death ==
Anderson died in 1950, aged 88. He was interred in Savannah's Bonaventure Cemetery. His widow survived him by six years and was buried beside him upon her death at the age of 82.
