= Edward Clifford Anderson =

United States and Confederate naval officer (1815–1883)

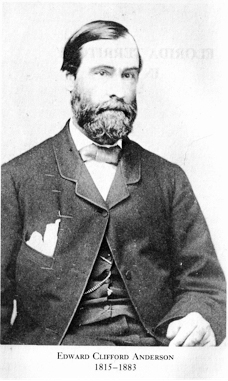
- Born: November 8, 1815; Savannah, Georgia
- Died: January 6, 1883 (aged 67); Savannah, Georgia
- Burial place: Laurel Grove Cemetery, Savannah, Georgia
- Relatives: George Anderson (father); George Wayne Anderson (brother); John Wayne Anderson (brother); Edward Clifford Anderson Jr. (nephew)
- Military career
- Allegiance: United States of America; Confederate States of America
- Branch: United States Navy; Confederate States Army
- Service years: 1834–1850 (USA); 1861–1865 (CSA)
- Rank: Union Navy Lieutenant (USA); Confederate Army Colonel
- Commands: City of Charleston; Old Fort Jackson; Mayor of Savannah 1854–1856; 1865–1869; 1873–1877
- Conflicts: American Civil War: Sherman's March to the Sea; Carolinas campaign; Second Battle of Charleston Harbor
- Other work: U.S. Army Officer, Confederate Army Officer, Mayor of Savannah

Edward Clifford Anderson Sr. (November 8, 1815 – January 6, 1883) was a naval officer in the United States Navy, mayor of Savannah, Georgia, and a colonel in the Confederate States Army during the American Civil War. He commanded Fort James Jackson near Savannah before its capture in 1864. He was elected mayor of Savannah eight times, before and after the war, and on December 6, 1865, he became the first mayor after the civil war.

== Early life and the US Navy ==
Anderson was the ninth child of George Anderson and Eliza Clifford Wayne. One of his brothers was John Wayne Anderson, who commanded the Republican Blues for over thirty years. Another, George Wayne Anderson, a prominent banker, named his son Edward Clifford Anderson Jr.

Anderson's grandfather, Captain George Anderson served in the American Revolutionary War and died aboard his ship, Georgia Paquet, on a trip to Great Britain in 1775. Growing up around the docks of Savannah, he dreamed of being a famous naval officer, much against his father's wishes. He attended the Round Hill School in Massachusetts from 1824 to 1830, before returning to Savannah, Georgia. Fulfilling his dream, he was appointed acting midshipman by Secretary of the Navy Levi Woodbury on October 20, 1833, he served on USS St. Louis for a year. On November 24, 1834, was commissioned midshipman and was assigned to 'Old Iron-sides', USS Constitution. He began keeping a diary during his tenure aboard Constitution, and added to it over the years, documenting his life and those of his shipmates. He later served on the frigate Macedonian, and on the sloops-of-war Warren, Vandalia, and Falmouth. During the years he cruised from Newfoundland to South America, Europe, the Caribbean Sea and the Gulf of Mexico. On May 16, 1840, he was promoted to passed midshipman, and became acting master of USS Falmouth.

He married Sarah McQueen Williamson of Savannah on February 10, 1841. Their first child, Mary, called Nina, was born on April 6, 1842, followed by a son, Edward Maffitt, born August 6, 1843. That year Anderson was assigned acting master for USS Lexington before she departed for a cruise of the Western Atlantic and the Mediterranean. Later he served as sailing master on the coastal steamer USS General Taylor, recording his thoughts and adventures in his diary that was later published as a book, 'Florida Territory in 1844, the Diary of Master Edward Clifford Anderson, USN'.

== Mexican–American War ==
In 1846, he was assigned to USS Mississippi, flagship of the West Indian Squadron Serving under Commodore Matthew C. Perry. During the Mexican–American War, he took part in expeditions against Alvarado, Tampico, Pánuco, and Laguna de Términos, all successful in tightening American control of the Mexican coastline and interrupting coastwise commerce and military supply operations. The ship returned to Norfolk for repairs on 1 January 1847, where Anderson was promoted to lieutenant. Mississippi then returned to battle, arriving at Veracruz on 21 March 1847, carrying Perry to take command of the American fleet. At once she and her men plunged into amphibious operations against Veracruz, supplying guns and their crews to be taken ashore for the battery which fought the city to surrender in four days. Through the remainder of the war, Mississippi contributed guns, men, and boats to a series of coastal raids on Mexico's east coast, taking part in the capture of Tabasco in June 1847.

After the war, Anderson was assigned to the United States Coast Survey. He resigned from the Navy on October 25, 1849, after 15 years of service and returned to Savannah. He became one of Georgia's most distinguished citizens, involved in agriculture, finance, politics and civic affairs. He was elected Mayor of Savannah for the first time in 1854, and won re-election in 1855.

== Civil War ==
At the outbreak of the Civil War, Anderson was sent to Richmond by Governor Joseph E. Brown, to purchase ordinance from the Tredegar Iron Works for the State of Georgia. Soon after, Anderson was personally summoned to Montgomery, Alabama, by the president of the Confederacy, Jefferson Davis, who commissioned him a Major in the Corps of Artillery. He was ordered at once to set sail for Europe, as a confidential agent to buy war material for the Confederacy, arranging for its transfer to the Confederate States, through the Union blockade by way of blockade runners. In England, he was stalked continually by spies hired by the United States Consul General, Charles Francis Adams. Anderson described his position as the Secretary of War in England. He and fellow Georgian James D. Bulloch negotiated with the British for the sale of warships and blockade runners to the South. Upon learning of the Southern victory at the First Battle of Bull Run, Anderson raised a Confederate Flag upon the rooftop of a friend's house in Liverpool. Their success in both exporting arms, and running the blockage prompted other British firms to begin blockade-running efforts. Returning home in November 1861, aboard the newly purchased Merchant Steamship Fingal with Bulloch, they delivered much needed arms and ammunition. Anderson was promoted, and served as "Commander of the River Batteries" as a part of General Robert E. Lee's staff. He was a member of the Confederate high command at Savannah until the end of the war. At this time, Anderson was placed in command of Fort James Jackson, becoming the Confederate headquarters for river defenses, including the Confederate Navy.

The construction of Fort James Jackson (also called Old Fort Jackson) was authorized by President Thomas Jefferson between 1808 and 1812. The fort, on the Savannah River a mile east of the city, was built on top of an old earthen battery dating from the Revolutionary War. At the time, war with Great Britain or France seemed likely, and Fort Jackson was the best site from which to protect Savannah from attack by sea. In the American Civil War, it was one of three forts protecting Savannah, the others being Fort Pulaski and Fort McAllister standing in Confederate defiance of the Union naval blockade. Fort McAllister was commanded at different times by two of his nephews, General Robert H. Anderson and Major George Wayne Anderson, who commanded the fort when it was overrun by Sherman's forces in December 1864. The loss of Fort McAllister opened the way to the sea for General Sherman, allowing him to link up with the Union Navy, resupply his forces, and bring the City of Savannah to its knees.

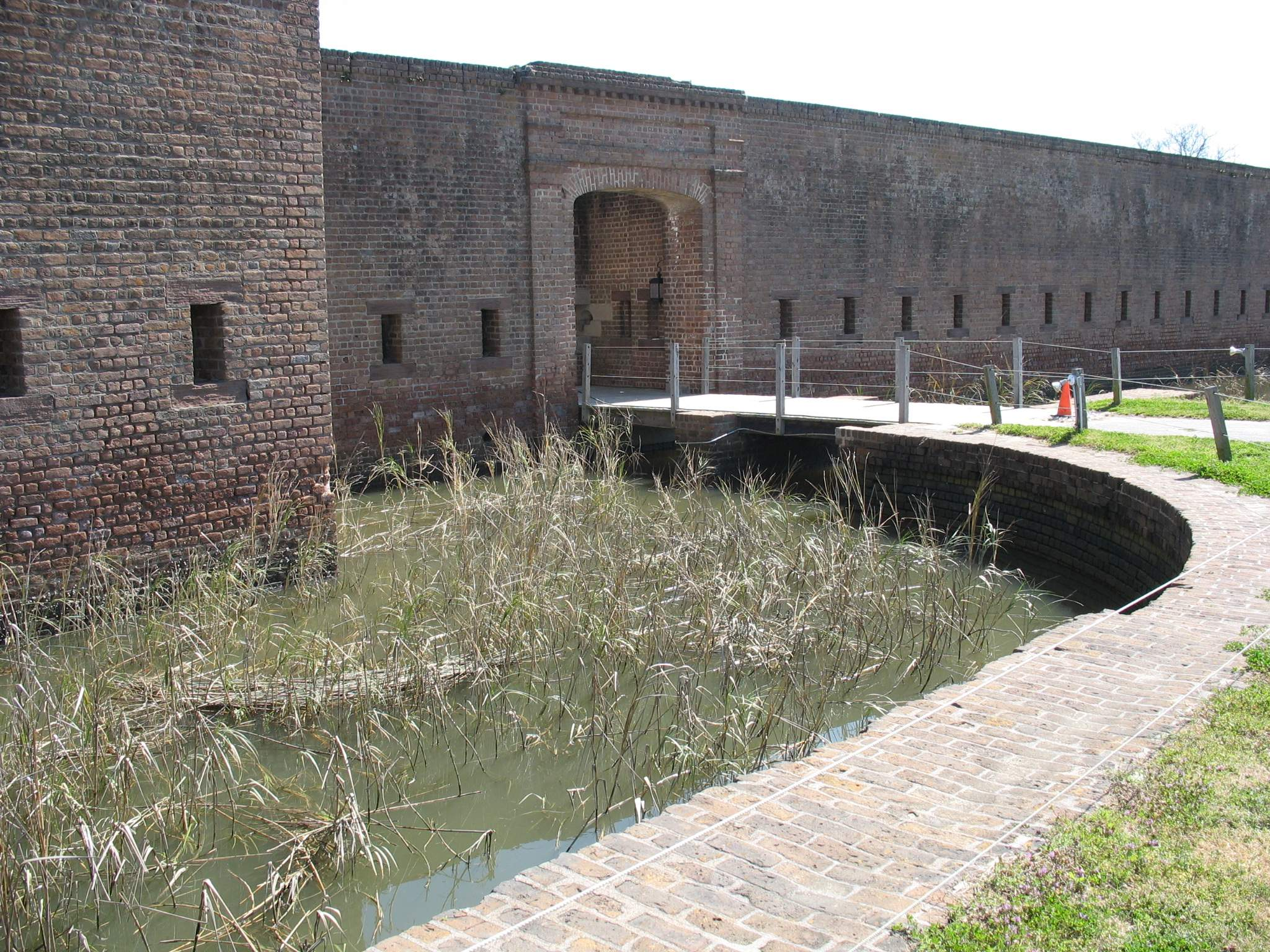
Fort James Jackson

Supervising the forts under his command, he was constantly sought out for his artillery expertise. During General Sherman's March to the Sea, Anderson led the City of Savannah's evacuation after its surrender and was subsequently placed in charge of the City of Charleston in December 1864. He was involved in the planning and execution of that city's evacuation before his transfer to Augusta, Georgia.

Within a month, a state convention of elected delegates was called to the state capitol in Milledgeville by the provisional governor of Georgia, James Johnson. Edward Clifford Anderson was one of the Chatham County representatives at the convention, where a unique resolution was passed calling for a special election for a mayor and a board of aldermen for the City of Savannah. On December 6, 1865, in the only balloting which had been allowed in the city since its surrender, Anderson was elected the first postwar mayor of Savannah.

== Politics and government service ==
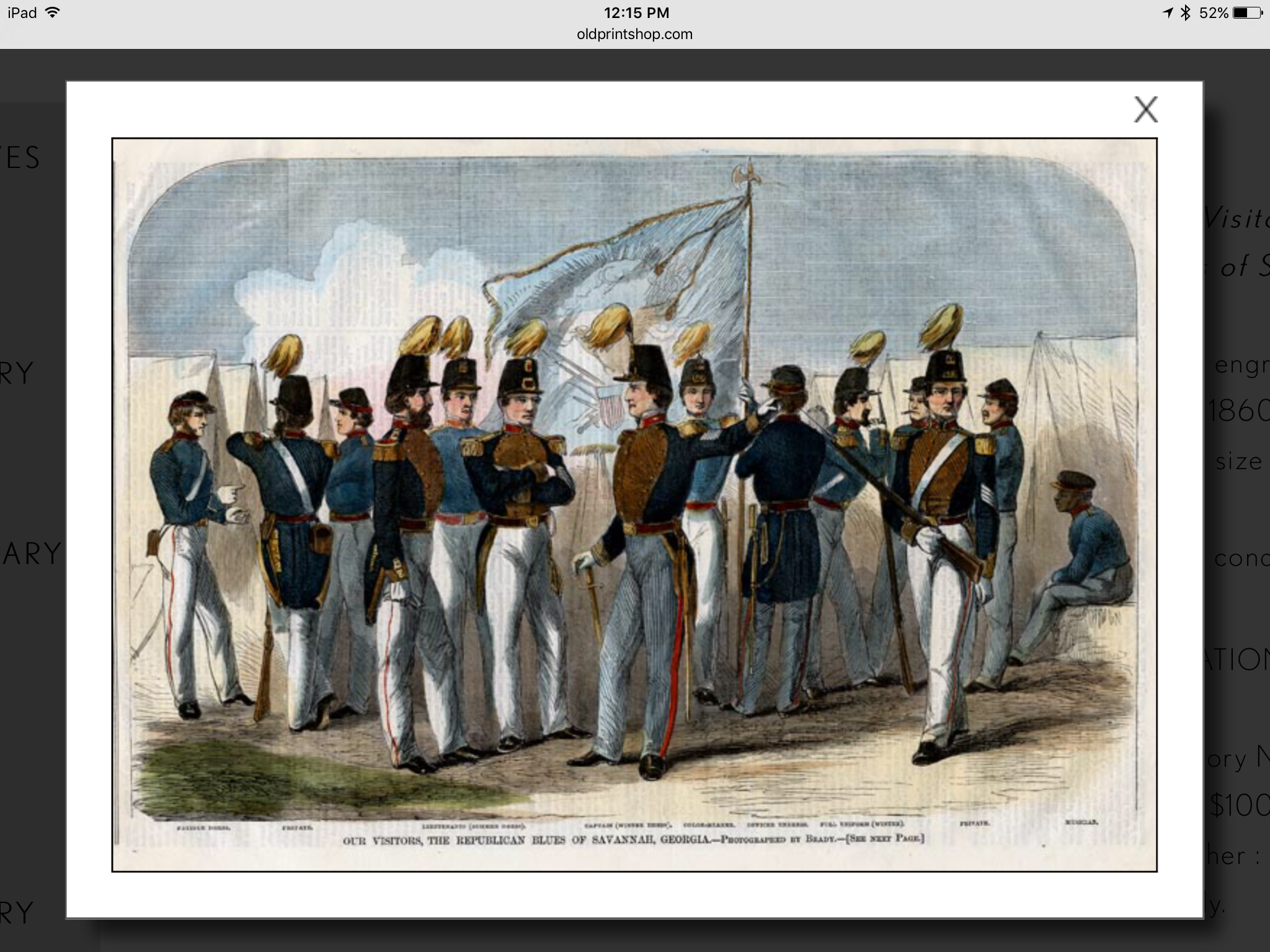
Republican Blues 1860

Anderson's third term of mayor began on October 15, 1865. The city was enduring many tribulations during the Reconstruction Era, including an outbreak of cholera. Mayor Anderson personally responded to many pleas for help and assistance, with the city council eventually reimbursing him for money he paid out personally to charity. Anderson levied taxes on sales, freight, and the banks to enlarge and reorganize the police force, under the command of his now famous nephew, General Robert H. Anderson. The city market and jail were made usable once more, with streets, sidewalks and sewers restored. In March, 1866, the Savannah Board of Education was inaugurated to educate the children of Savannah, under the direction of the mayor. Business and commerce were among the top priorities for the new mayor, along with removing obstructions from the river, expanding the docks, and finishing the Georgia Central Railroad.

To improve the lives of ordinary citizens, Anderson held a "Mayor's Court" each day, to hear and decide cases related to drunkenness, theft, wife-beating, murder, rioting and other public disturbances. This good governance served the city well, as it recovered from the damages of the war. At the end of his third term in office, Anderson did not offer himself up for re-election. On the afternoon of October 20, 1869, the police force, in full dress uniform marched to Anderson's home to salute their former commander. He served on the board of directors of the Southern Bank, was director of the Atlantic and Gulf Railroad, and on the board of directors of the Central Railroad and Banking Company. The Savannah City Council sent Anderson in secret to Washington, D.C., to protest Governor Rufus Bullock and his efforts to have Georgia remanded back to military control. During that time, he met with both President Ulysses S. Grant and General William Tecumseh Sherman in an attempt to have the Governor removed, to no avail.

Anderson was convinced to run for mayor once again, winning his seventh election to the office. On January 28, 1873, the Savannah News published a story detailing Anderson's political career, stating that "He is justly regarded as one of Savannah's most useful and honored citizens, and his election... at this crisis in our public affairs is hailed as a good omen of the future." During this term in office, he succeeded in passing bonds to cover the city's debt, and working with the United States Government to dredge the Savannah River channel, and expanded telegraph lines to locations like Tybee Island. His focus on business and commerce secured re-election for a second two-year term in 1875.

In 1877, Anderson did not offer himself for reelection, now being 62 years of age. His health slowly began to deteriorate, but he continued his civic interests, serving as president of both the Savannah Board of Education and the Chatham Academy Board of Trustees. He was also a member of the governing board of the Georgia Historical Society, the hospital for Negroes, the Chamber of Commerce and other organizations. His name was submitted twice for appointment as Secretary of the Navy. In 1881 his nomination was recommended to President Garfield by the commanding general of the U.S. Army, William Tecumseh Sherman, and several Admirals suggesting the high esteem in which Anderson was held, even by former enemies. In November 1882 he became ill and was confined to home. He died on January 6, 1883, at the age of 67.

The Savannah Morning News printed a long obituary emphasizing Anderson's career as an officer in the United States Navy and the Confederate States Army. The article stated that "This community has lost one of its most highly respected and useful citizens". A week later, the Savannah Board of Education published a separate eulogy to his memory, extolling their former president's unselfish devotion to the encouragement of learning. His funeral was attended by the mayor and aldermen of the city, the board of education, the United States Navy, the police and fire departments and many others. He is buried in Savannah's Laurel Grove Cemetery, near the Anderson family vault in lot 540.

== Gallery ==
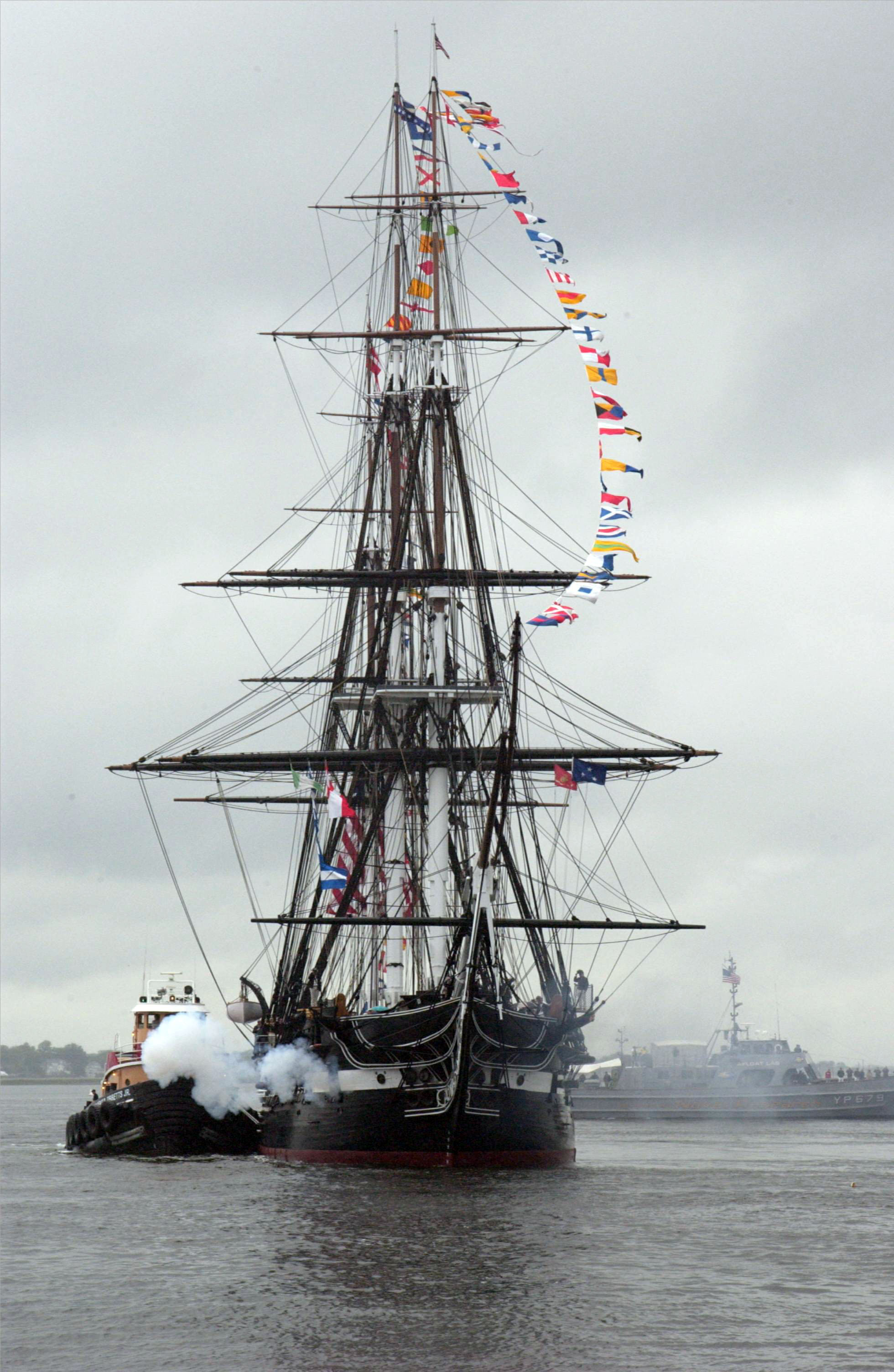
USS Constitution salutes

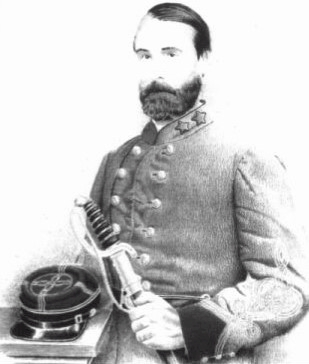
Colonel Edward Clifford Anderson

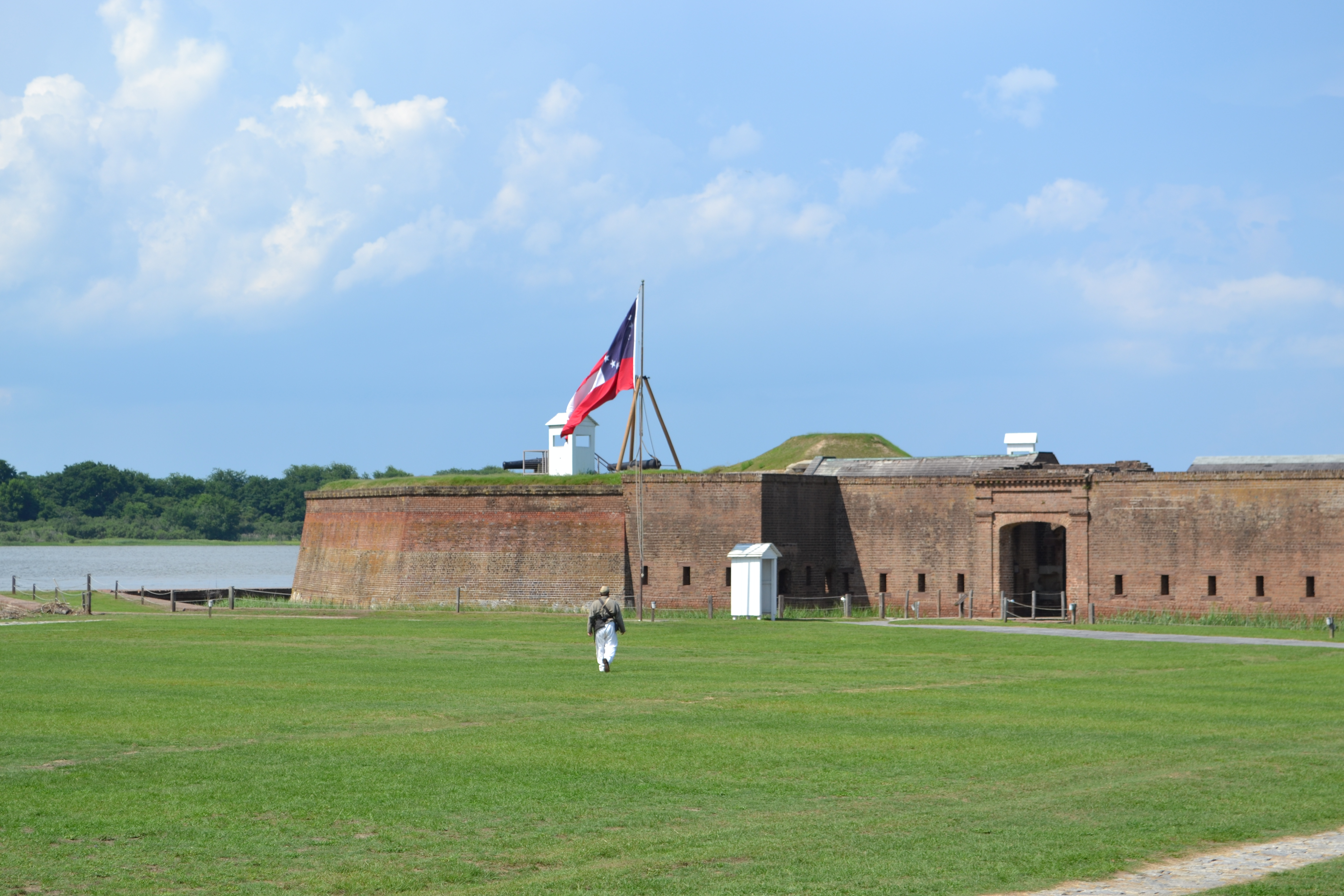
Fort James Jackson exterior

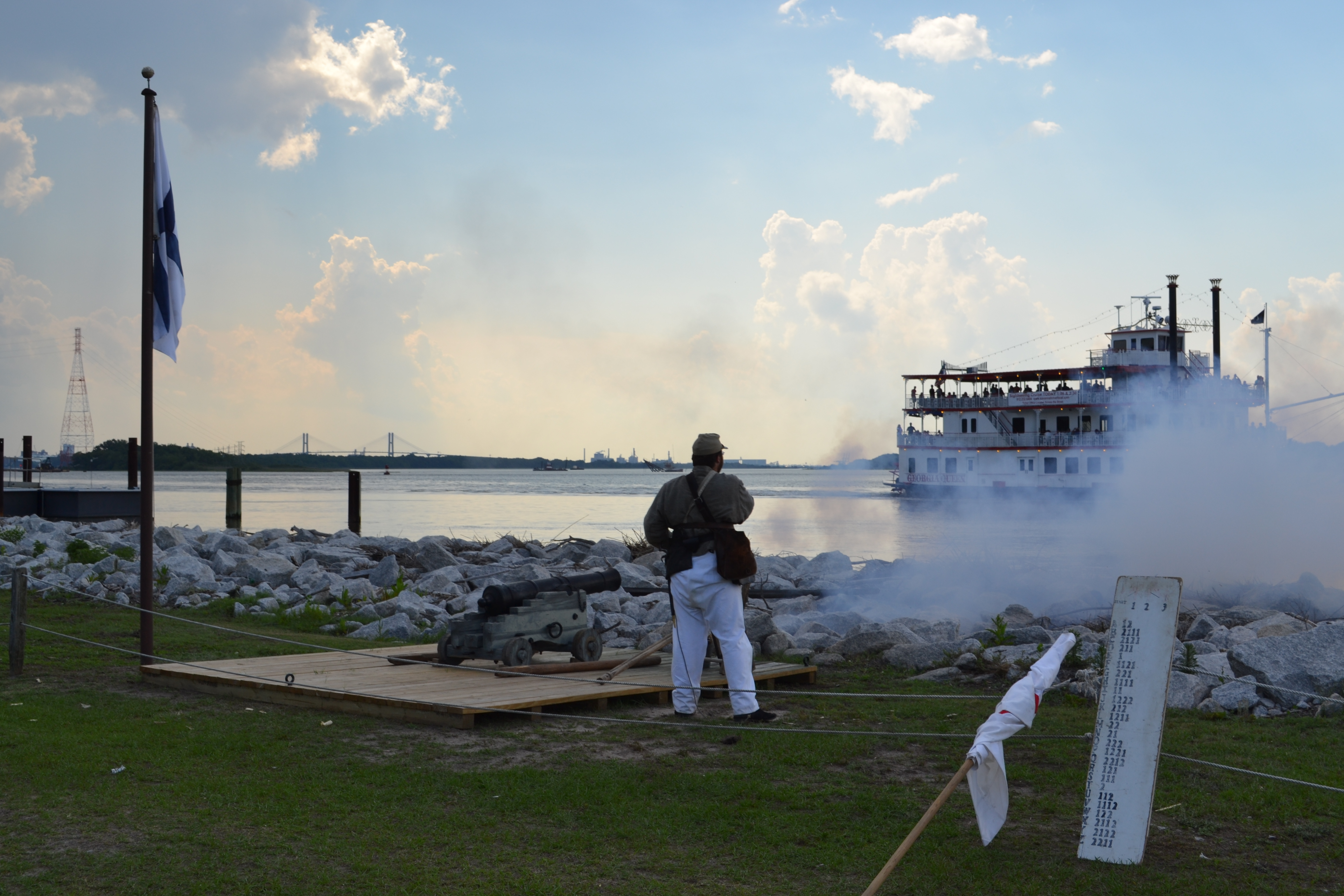
Firing signal cannon at Fort James Jackson

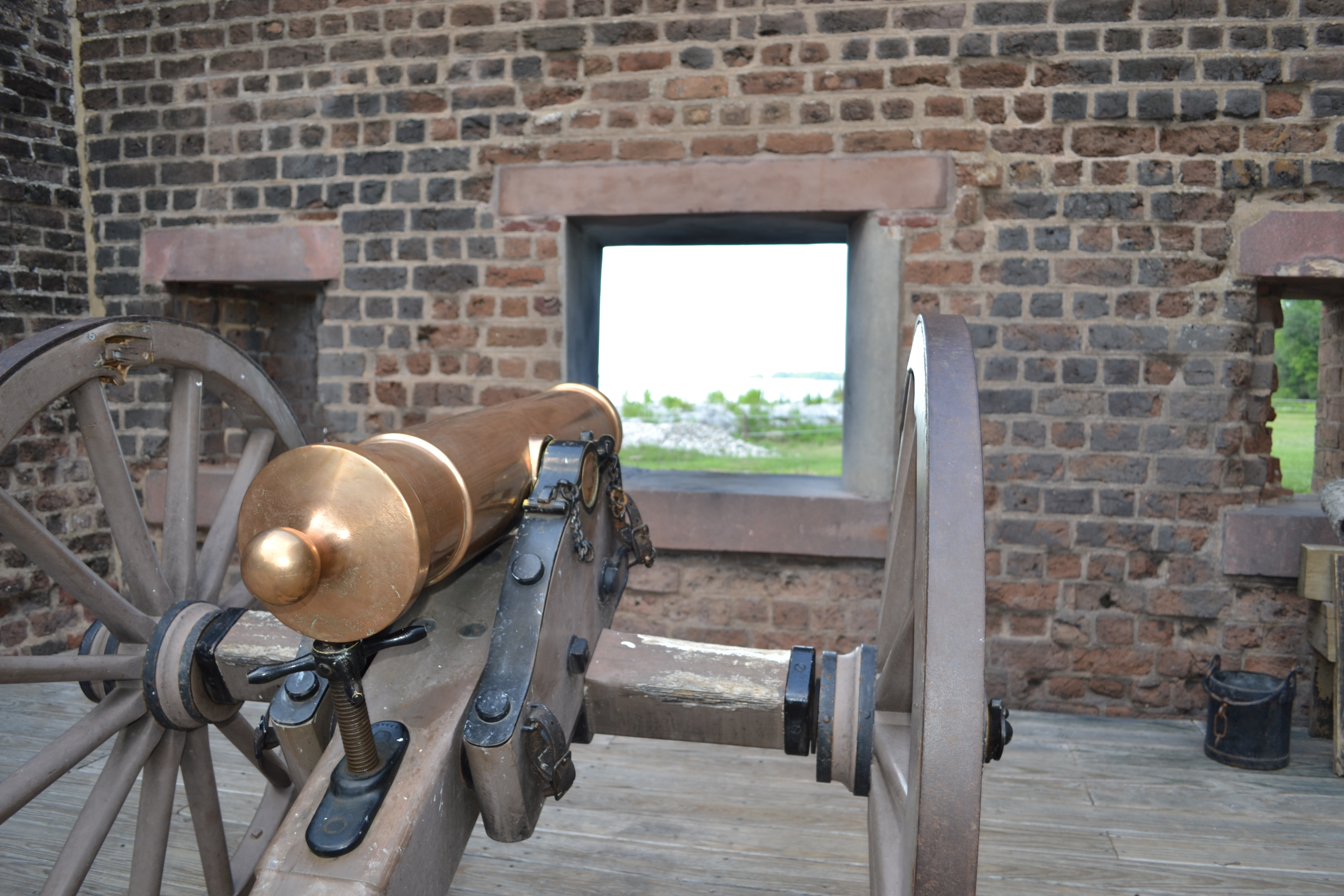
Fort James Jackson interior cannon

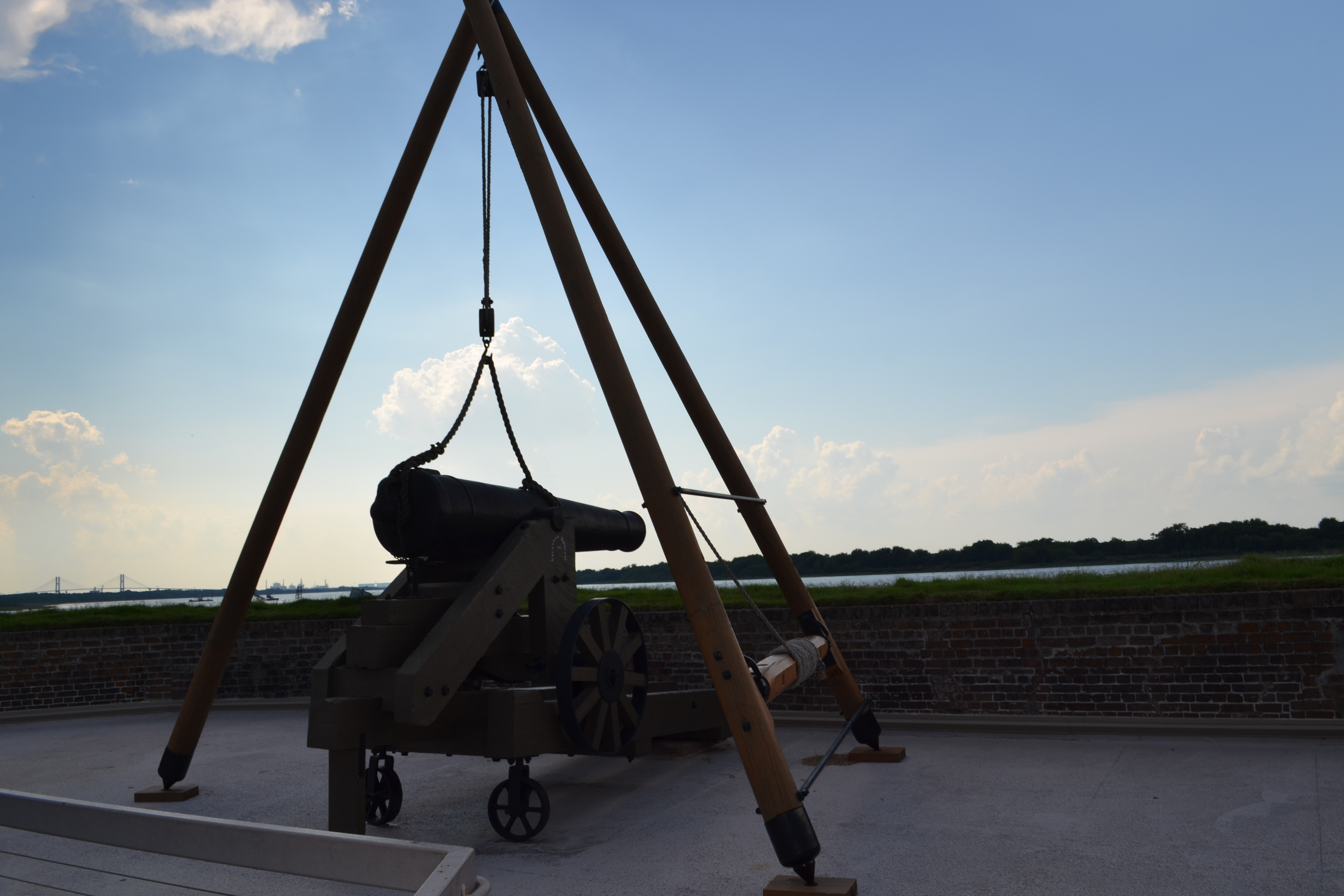
Cannon suspended at Fort James Jackson

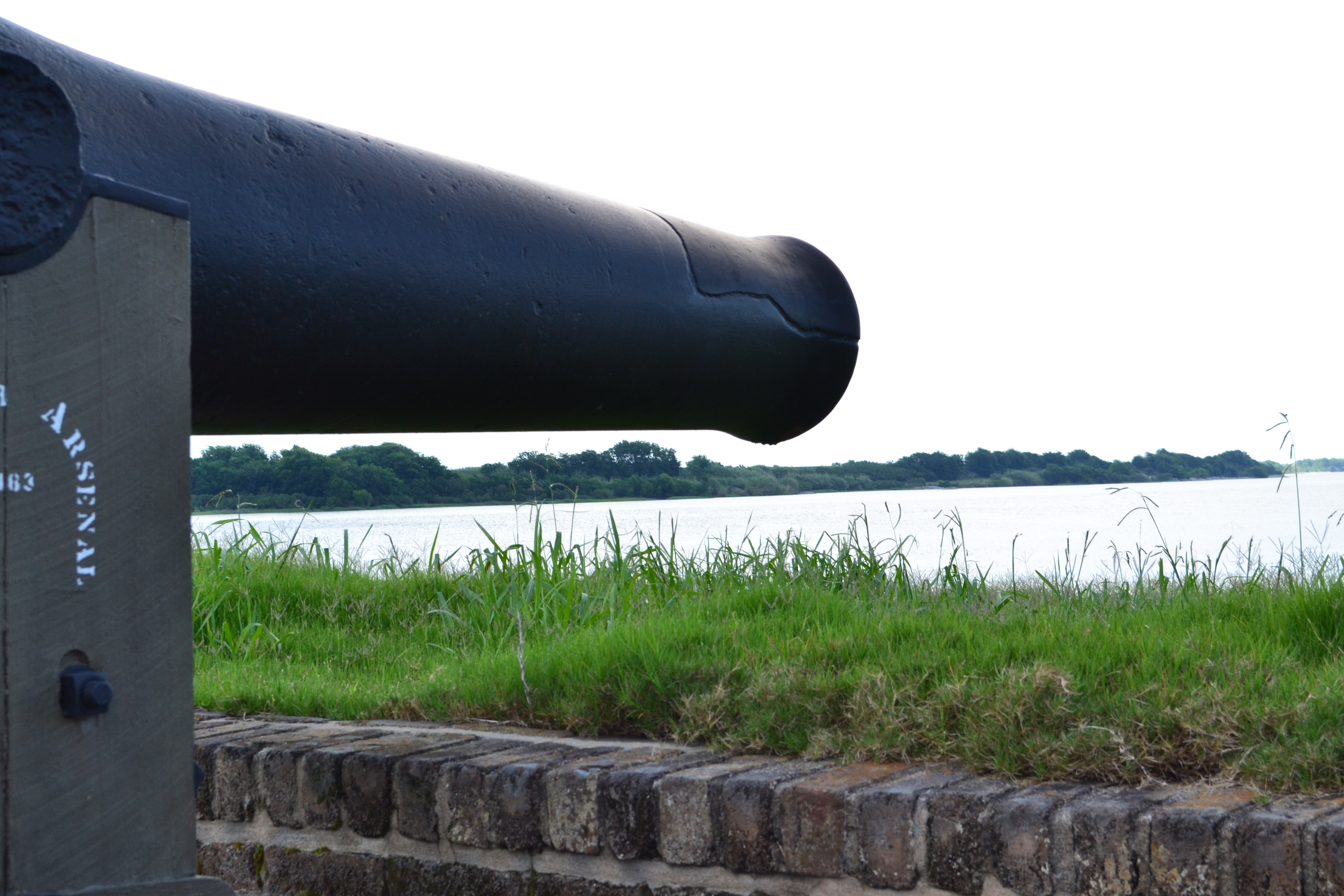
Fort James Jackson on the Savannah River

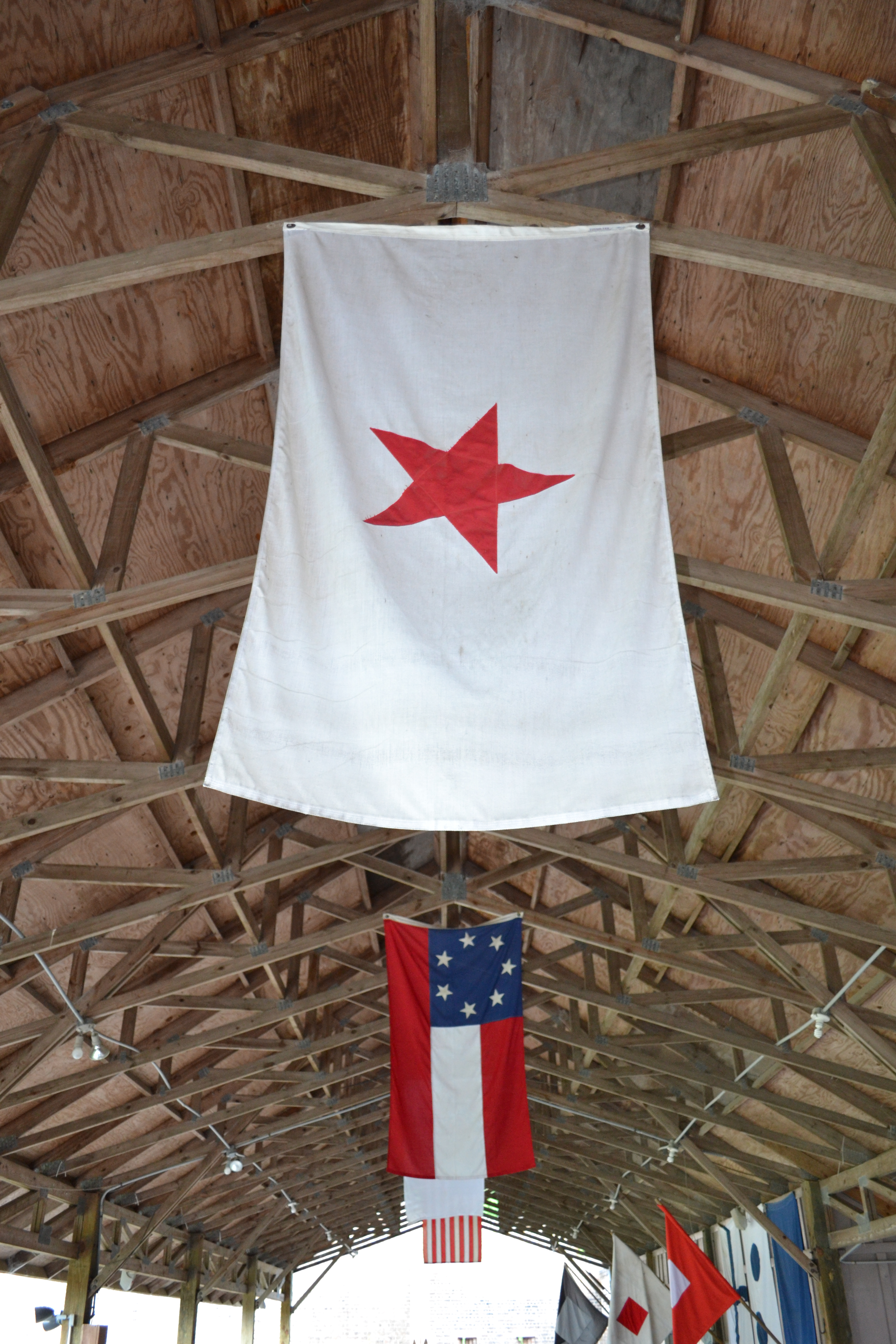
Civil War–era flag of the State of Georgia at Fort James Jackson

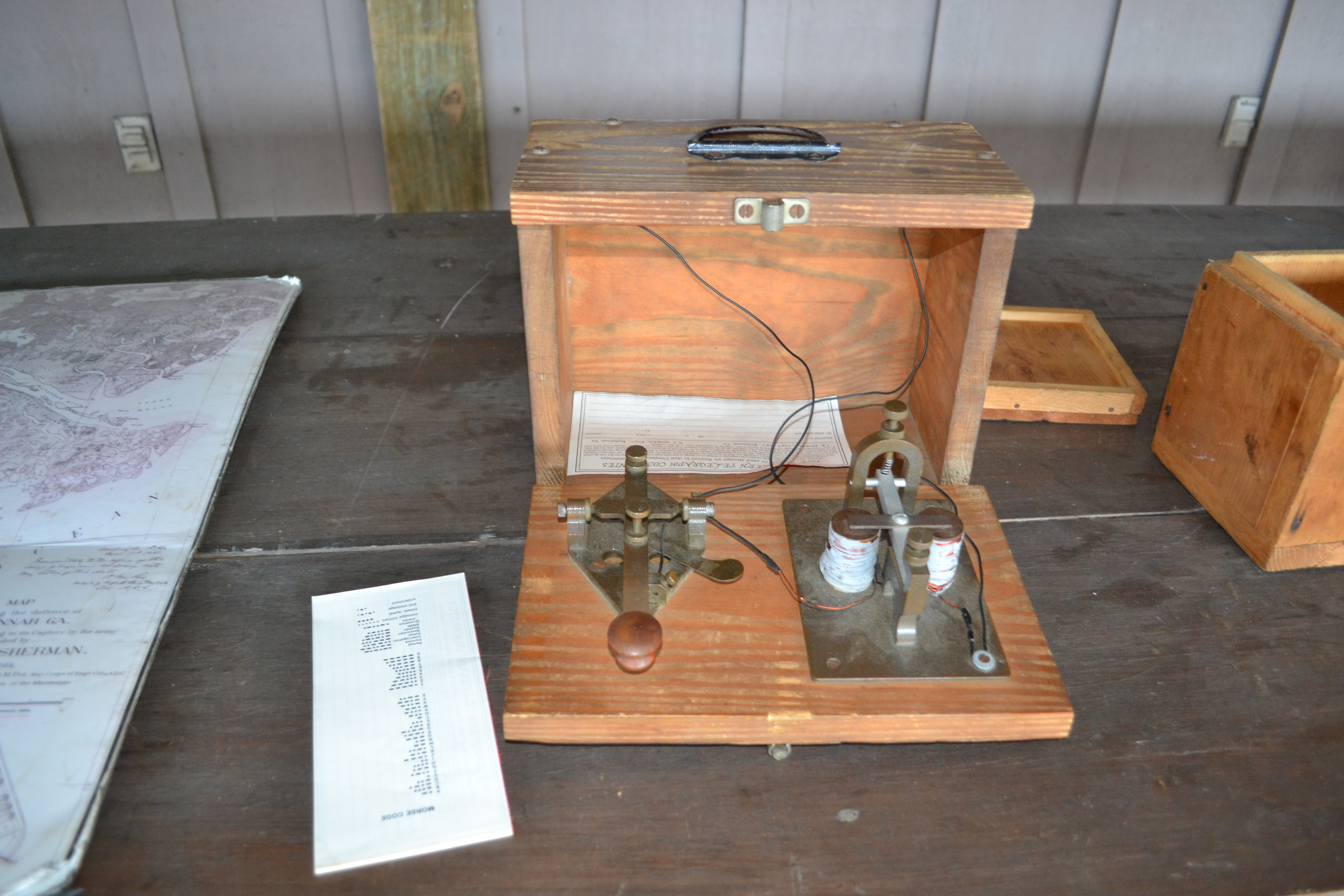
Civil War telegraph at Fort James Jackson

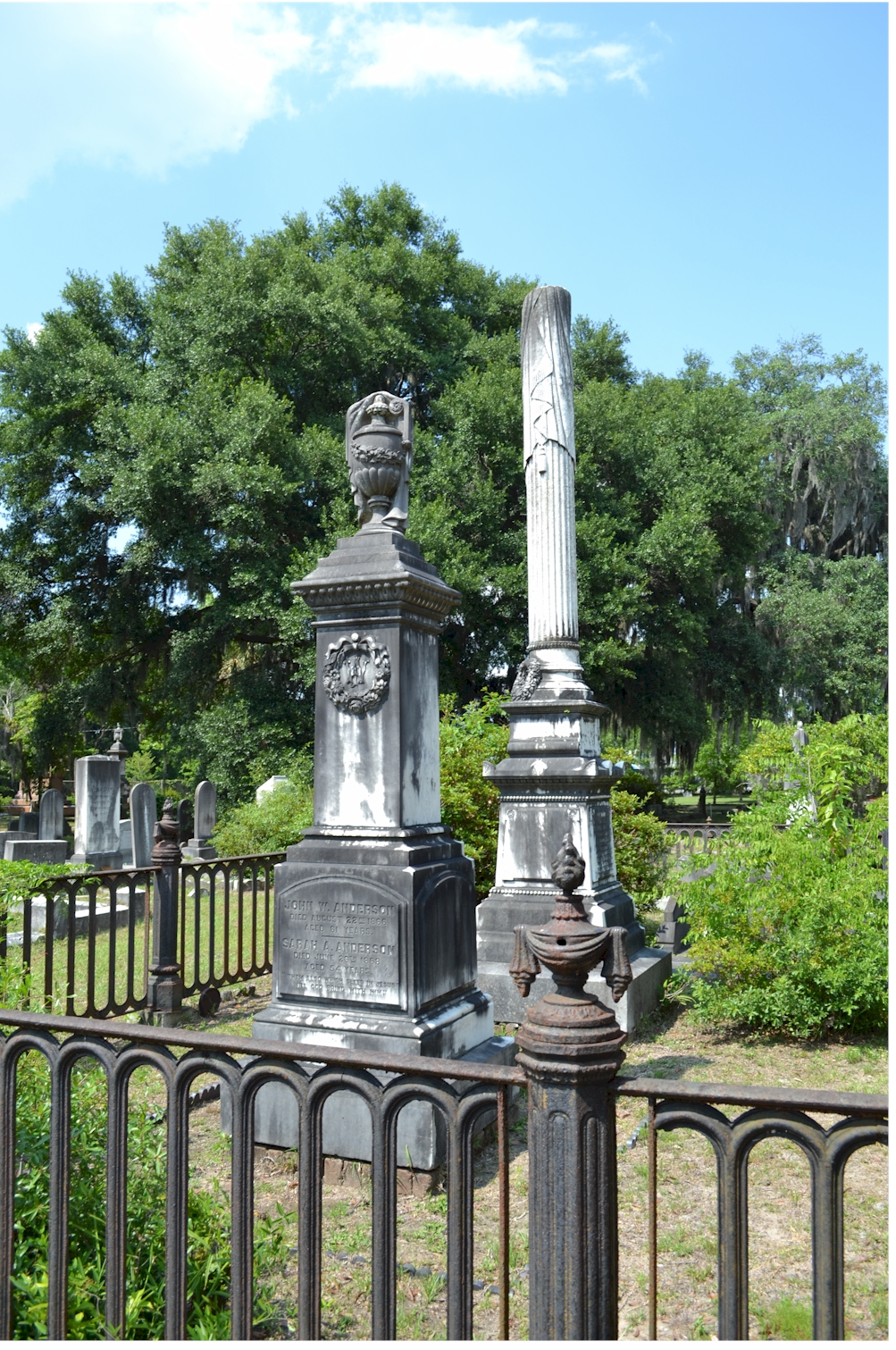
Edward Clifford Anderson and John Wayne Anderson grave site at Laurel Grove Cemetery, Savannah, Georgia

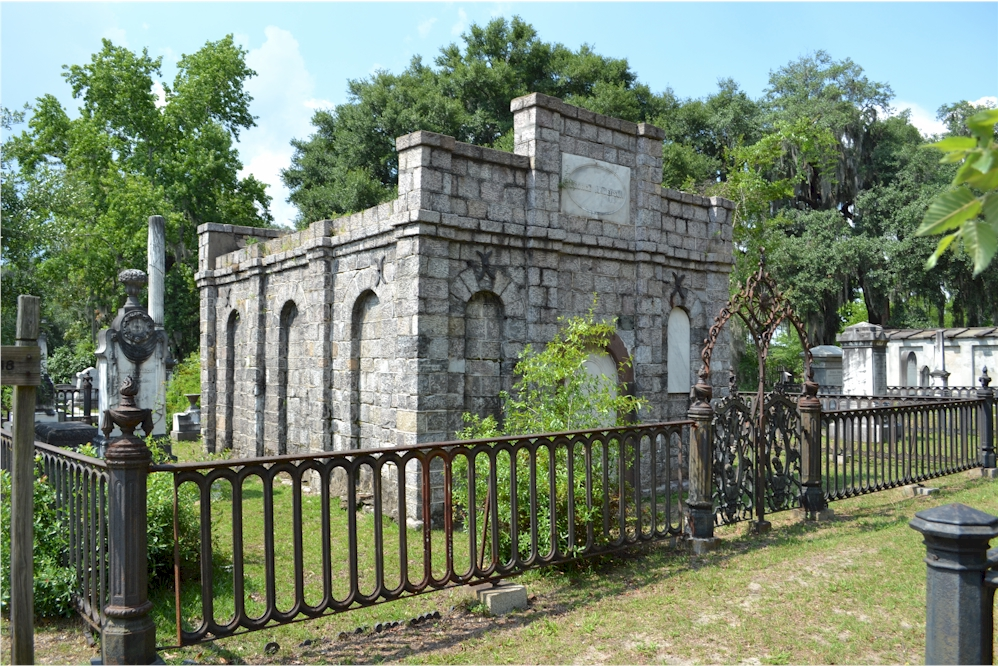
Anderson family vault at Laurel Grove Cemetery, Savannah

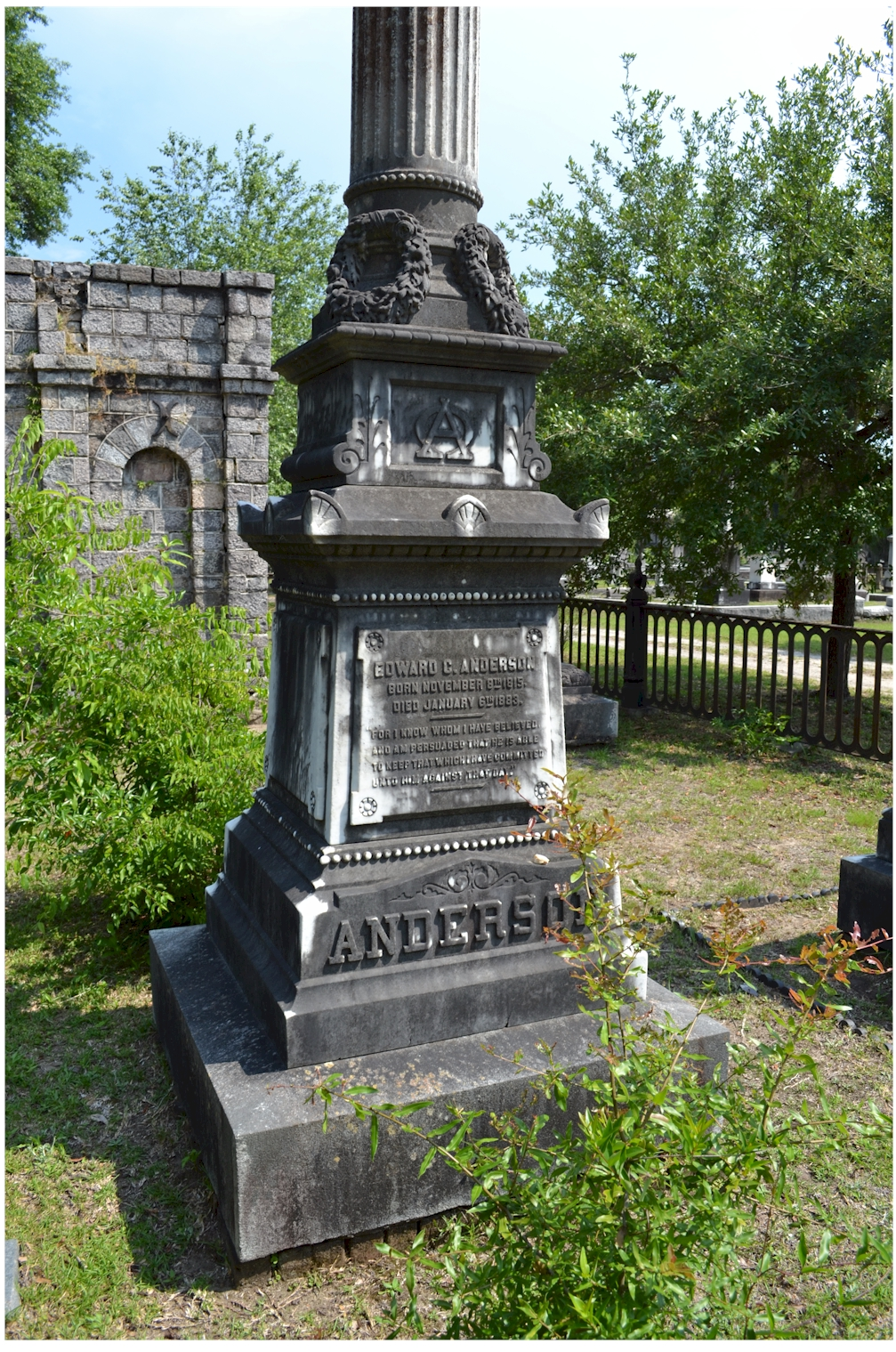
Edward Clifford Anderson grave marker

== See also ==
- USS Constitution
- Blockade Runners of the American Civil War
- Fingal/CSS Atlanta/USS Atlanta
- Old Fort Jackson
- Chatham Artillery
- Sinclair, Hamilton and Company — British arms dealer through whom Anderson secured arms for the Confederacy
- 9 Drayton Street, formerly owned by Anderson
