= John Wayne Anderson Jr. =

United States Army captain (1843–1901)

- Born: September 20, 1843; Georgia, U.S.
- Died: February 16, 1901 (aged 57); Savannah, Georgia, U.S.
- Burial place: Bonaventure Cemetery, Savannah, Georgia, U.S.
- Spouse: Jessie Choisie Wragg (m. 1865–1896; her death)
- Relatives: John Wayne Anderson (father); Sarah Ann Houston (mother); Robert H. Anderson (brother); George Wayne Anderson (brother)
- Military career
- Conflicts: American Civil War

John Wayne Anderson Jr. (September 20, 1843 – February 16, 1901) was a captain in the Confederate States Army during the American Civil War.

== Early life ==
Anderson was born in 1843 in Georgia, United States, to John Wayne Anderson and Sarah Ann Houston. His siblings were Robert, Eliza, George, Clarence and Clifford. Robert later served as brigadier general in the Confederate States Army. George was an officer during the American Civil War. Eliza married Walter Scott Chisholm, a noted lawyer.

== Career ==
At the outset of the Civil War, Anderson entered the Confederate States Army. He became captain during the campaign. At the war's conclusion, he became a businessman in Savannah, Georgia. He later moved to New York City, where he worked in government customs services.

== Personal life ==
In 1865, a year before his father's death, Anderson married Jessie Choisie Wragg, with whom he had two known children: daughters Caroline in 1867 and Jessie in 1869.

== Death ==
Anderson died in 1901, aged 57. He was interred in Savannah's Bonaventure Cemetery, alongside his wife, who predeceased him by five years. His parents are buried in the city's Laurel Grove Cemetery.
