= George Anderson (captain) =

United States Army captain (died 1775)

- Born: Berwick-upon-Tweed, England
- Died: September 1775
- Spouse: Deborah Grant (m. 1761–1775; his death)
- Children: 3, including George Anderson
- Relatives: Edward Clifford Anderson (grandson)
- Military career
- Allegiance: United States of America
- Rank: Captain
- Conflicts: American Revolutionary War

George Anderson (died September 1775) was a captain in the Continental Navy during the American Revolutionary War. Believed to have been the first member of the noted American branch of the Anderson family, he emigrated to New York City before 1760. He died at sea in 1775.

== Early life ==
It is believed that Anderson was born in Berwick-upon-Tweed, England, and emigrated to colonial America before 1760.

== Career ==
In 1763, Anderson moved south from New York to Savannah, Province of Georgia, where he became the owner and commander of the ship Georgia Paquet.

== Personal life ==
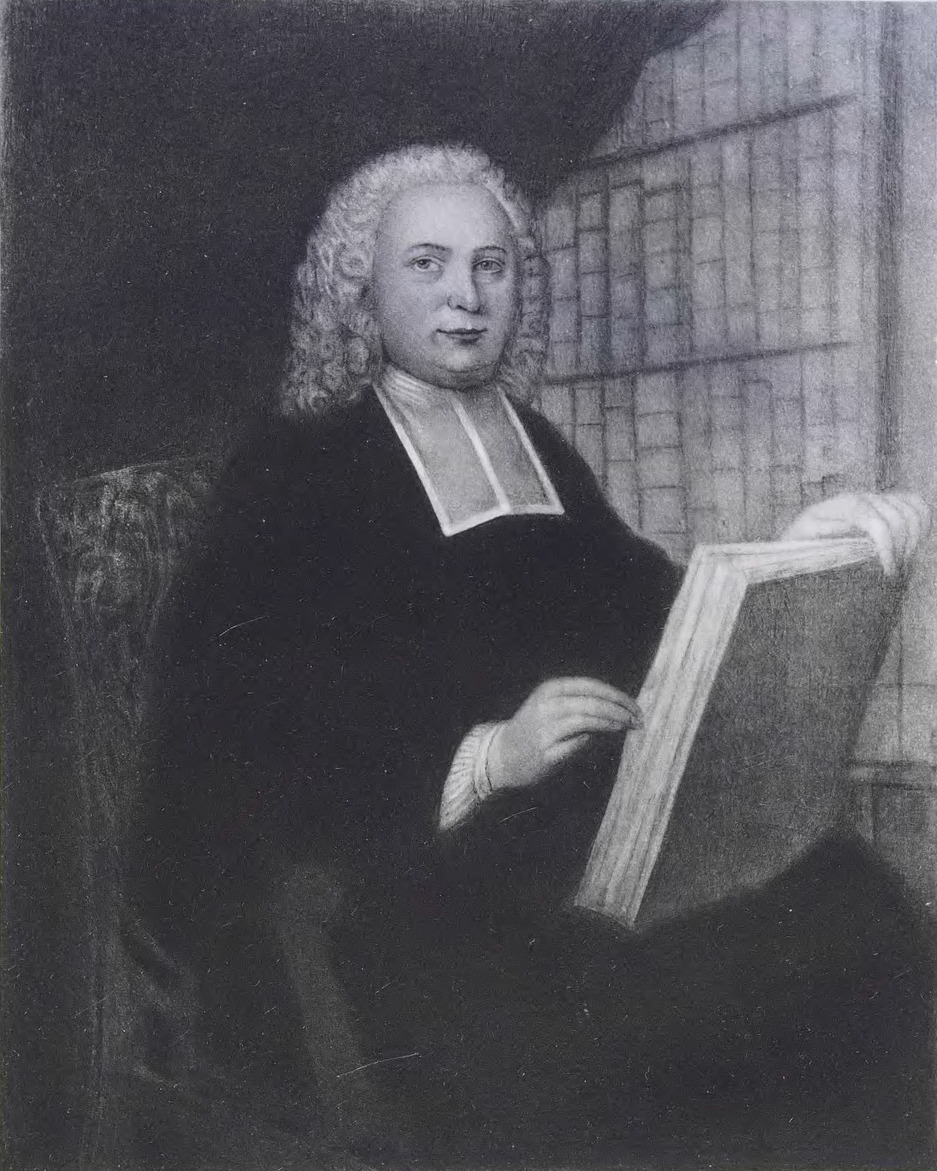
Reverend Henry Barclay

In 1761, Anderson married Deborah Grant (born 1736) at Trinity Church in New York City. Reverend Henry Barclay was the celebrant. They had three children: John, Mary and George. George was a noted merchant in Savannah. He owned a plantation near there called "Berwick".

=== Notable relatives ===
- George Anderson (1767–1847), son
- George Wayne Anderson (1796–1872), nephew
- Edward Clifford Anderson Jr. (1839–1876), nephew
- Edward Clifford Anderson (1815–1883), grandson

== Death ==
Anderson died aboard his ship, Georgia Paquet, on a trip to Great Britain in September 1775. His widow survived him by 37 years. She died in 1812, aged 70, and was interred in Savannah's Colonial Park Cemetery.
