= Second Battle of Fort McAllister =

1864 battle of the American Civil War

Coordinates: 31.8888°N 81.1941°W

- Part of the Siege of Savannah
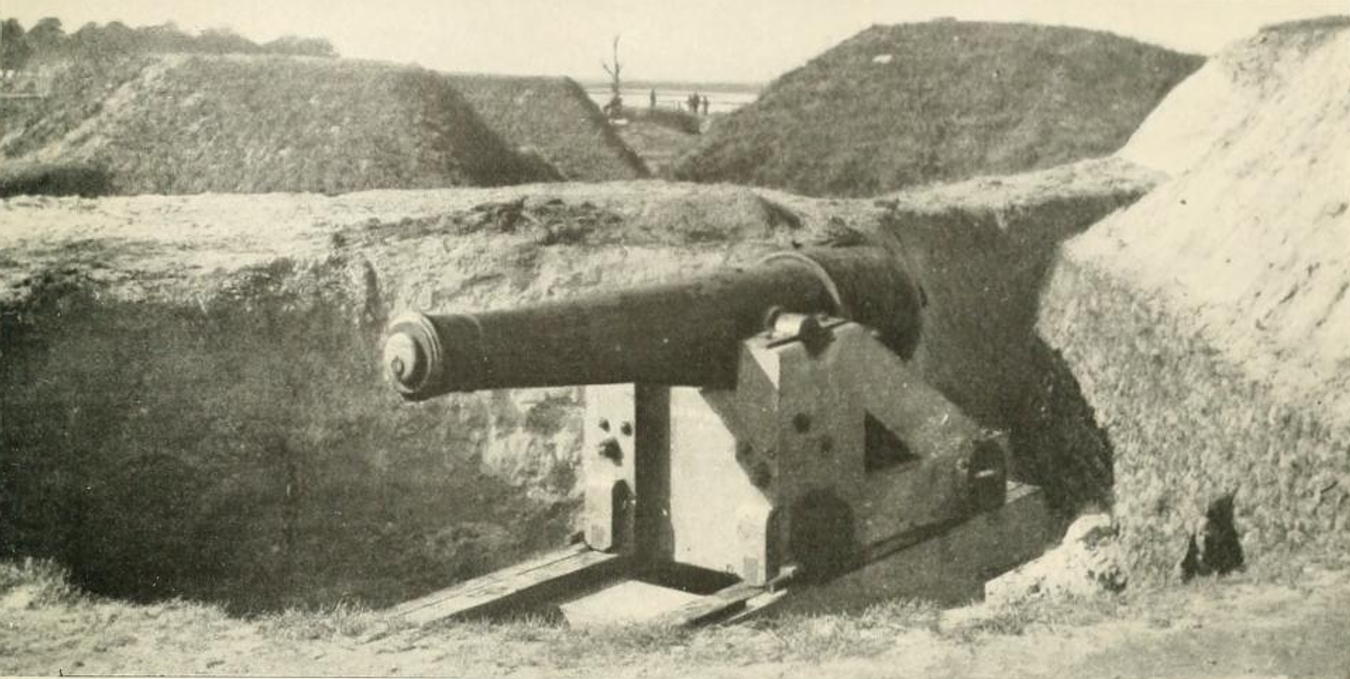
- Captured Confederate gun at Fort McAllister
Date	December 13, 1864
Location	Bryan County, Georgia
Result	Union victory

Belligerents
United States (Union)	Confederate States

Commanders and leaders
(United States) William B. Hazen	(Confederate States of America) George W. Anderson

Units involved
2nd Division, XV Corps, Army of the Tennessee	Fort McAllister Garrison

Strength
4,000	230

Casualties and losses
134	250
- Location within Georgia

The Second Battle of Fort McAllister took place December 13, 1864, during the final stages of Maj. Gen. William T. Sherman's March to the Sea during the American Civil War. Union forces overwhelmed a small Confederate force defending the strategically important Fort McAllister near Savannah, Georgia, a major Federal objective.

== Prelude ==
As Sherman's armies neared Savannah on December 10, following their lengthy march from Atlanta, his troops were in need of supplies. Just off the coast was Admiral John A. Dahlgren's fleet waiting with the needed supplies, as well as mail that had not been delivered to Sherman's men for six weeks during their march. However, Confederate fortifications around Savannah prevented Dahlgren from linking up with Sherman. As Sherman deployed his forces to invade Savannah, his cavalry reconnoitered Fort McAllister and other nearby fortifications, and determined that the lightly defended fort could be taken by a determined infantry attack. Sherman realized that if Fort McAllister was reduced, the Union Army would control the Ogeechee River, providing an avenue to the sea. Sherman ordered Maj. Gen. Oliver Otis Howard's Army of the Tennessee to reduce the fort. Howard chose the division commanded by Brig. Gen. William B. Hazen to lead the attack.

== Battle ==
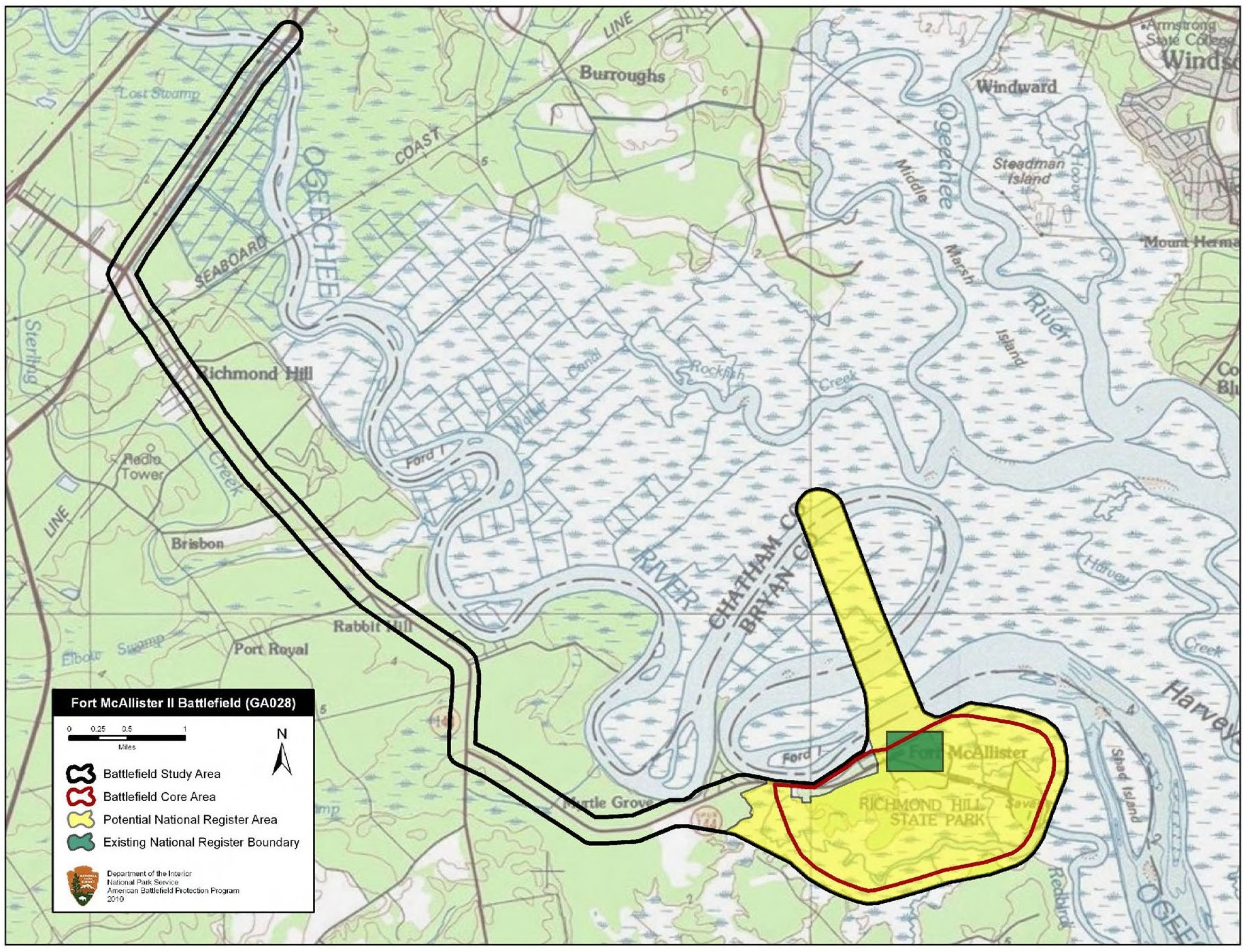
Map of Fort McAllister 1864 Battlefield core and study areas by the American Battlefield Protection Program.

On December 13, 1864, Hazen's 4,000-man division was deployed to storm the fort. Sherman and Howard climbed to an observation platform erected on top of an abandoned rice mill to observe the progress. In the surrounding woods Hazen formed his three brigades commanded respectively by Colonels Theodore Jones, Wells Jones and John M. Oliver. As the Sun was setting, a Union Navy ship, USS Dandelion, steamed into view from Ossabaw Sound. Sherman signaled that the fort was still in enemy hands but would be theirs in a minute. Just then Hazen's men emerged from the woods and advanced towards the fort widely spaced apart to limit effectiveness of artillery. Confederate Major George W. Anderson commanded about 230 veteran troops in Fort McAllister. Hazen's troops charged through the abatis and buried torpedoes and soon reached the parapet and overwhelmed the defenders; the fort fell in 15 minutes.

== Aftermath ==
Sherman was overjoyed with the victory and rowed down the Ogeechee to view the fort. That evening at Lebanon plantation, now serving as Gen. Hazen's Headquarters, Lt. Col Strong, General Sherman and Gen. Hazen had supper with Major Anderson, Commander of the now defeated fortification who was confined there at Lebanon, in his childhood home. During this meeting, General Sherman expressed great frustration at Major Anderson having planting land mines along the land route into the fort, finding it a less-than gentlemanly tactic. General Sherman personally ordered Major Anderson to join the details of captured Confederates tasked with clearing these mines following the battle. Before being confined, Anderson observed a company of Union soldiers marching out of the fort, on a course that would lead them into some buried ordinance that would have detonated under their feet. Taking their hand, Anderson led them out of harms way. This story was fondly remembered years later in a letter from the once-young lieutenant George W. Sylvis of the 47th Ohio, when he wrote to his old adversary.

The day after the battle, Sherman rowed out to Dahlgren's flagship to greet the admiral. Sherman also had reason to be proud of the troops that had taken part in the victory at Fort McAllister; they were the same troops he had personally led as a division commander at Shiloh and a corps commander at Vicksburg. With his supply line now open, Sherman was able to prepare for the siege and capture of Savannah, a goal he achieved by Christmas.

== Opposing forces ==
=== Union ===
Military Division of the Mississippi - MG William T. Sherman
Army of the Tennessee - MG Oliver O. Howard

XV Corps - MG Peter J. Osterhaus

Division	Brigade	Regiments and others
2nd Division - BG William B. Hazen	1st Brigade - Col Theodore Jones	55th Illinois; 116th Illinois; 127th Illinois; 6th Missouri; 8th Missouri; 30th Ohio
2nd Division - BG William B. Hazen	2nd Brigade - Col Wells S. Jones	111th Illinois; 83rd Indiana; 37th Ohio; 47th Ohio; 53rd Ohio; 54th Ohio
2nd Division - BG William B. Hazen	3rd Brigade - Col John M. Oliver	99th Indiana; 48th Illinois; 90th Illinois; 15th Michigan; 57th Ohio; 70th Ohio

=== Confederate ===
Fort McAllister Garrison - Maj George W. Anderson

- Clinch's Light Battery
- Emmett Rifles
- 1st Regiment, Georgia Reserves

== See also ==
- First Battle of Fort McAllister
