= John Wayne Anderson =

American businessman (1805–1866)

Personal details
- Born: 1805 Georgia, U.S.
- Died: August 22, 1866 (aged 60–61) Macon, Georgia, U.S.
- Resting place: Laurel Grove Cemetery, Savannah, Georgia, U.S.
- Spouse: Sarah Ann Houston (m. 1834–1866; his death)
- Relations: Robert H. Anderson (son); George Wayne Anderson Jr. (son); John Wayne Anderson Jr. (son); George Wayne Anderson Sr. (brother); Edward Clifford Anderson Sr. (brother)
- Parent(s): George Anderson; Elizabeth Clifford Wayne
- Education: Union College

John Wayne Anderson (1805 – August 22, 1866) was an American businessman who was eminent in Savannah, Georgia. He also became a captain in Confederate States Army.

== Early life ==
Anderson was born in 1805 in Georgia, the fifth child of prominent merchant George Anderson and Elizabeth Clifford Wayne, a South Carolina native and a sister of the Honorable James M. Wayne, Justice of the U.S. Supreme Court. His siblings included George Wayne Anderson, who became a major in the United States Army during the War of 1812, and Edward Clifford Anderson, a naval officer in the United States Navy and mayor of Savannah, Georgia.

Anderson graduated from Union College in Schenectady, New York, in 1825.

== Personal life ==
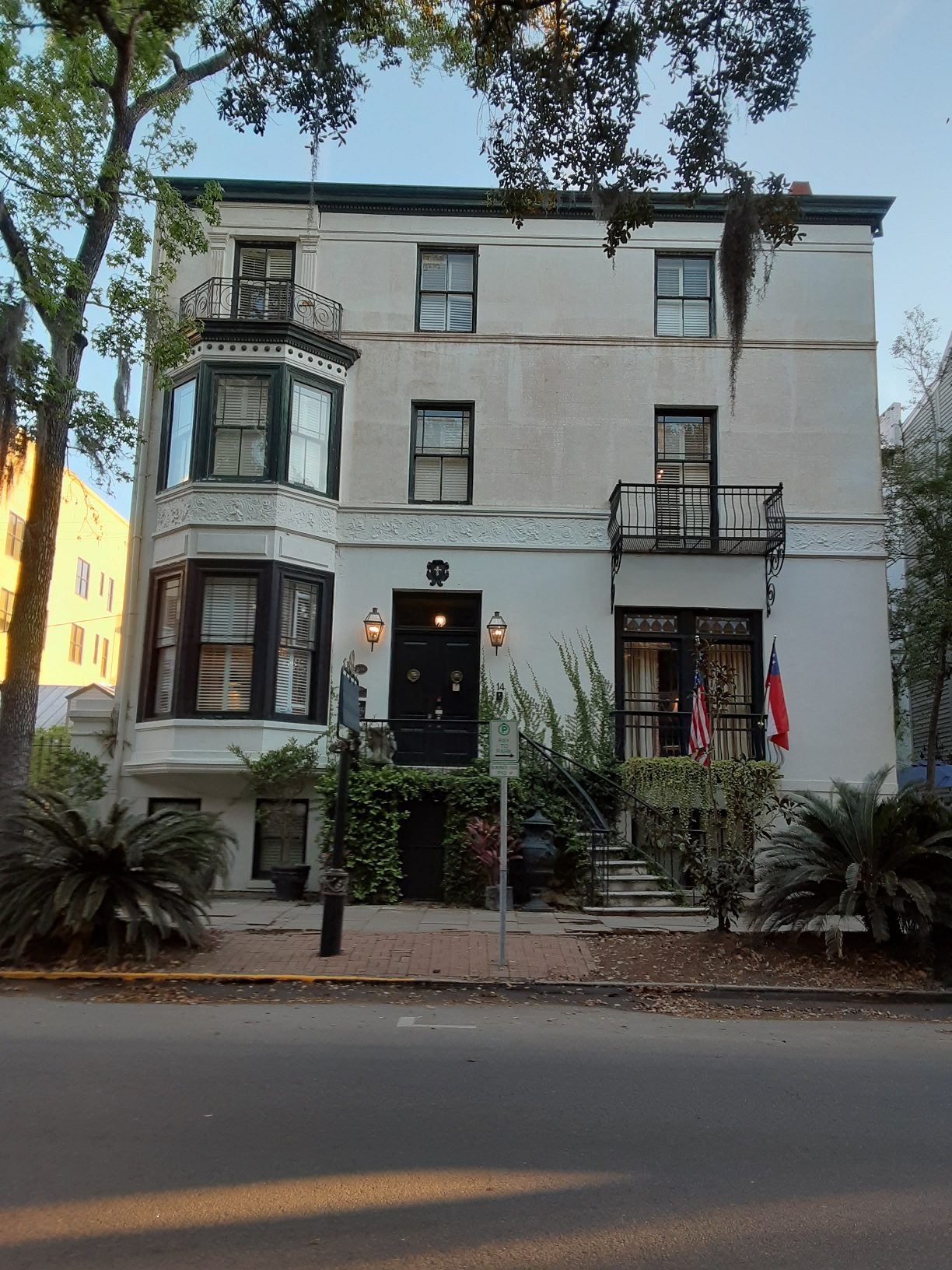
Anderson lived at 14 East Oglethorpe Avenue in Savannah

In 1834, Anderson married Sarah Ann Houston, granddaughter of Sir Patrick Houstoun, of colonial-era Georgia. They had six children: Robert, Eliza, George, John Jr., Clarence and Clifford. Robert later served as brigadier general in the Confederate States Army. Eliza married Walter Scott Chisholm, a noted lawyer.

In 1857, Anderson bought the home built four years earlier by his brother, George, at 14 East Oglethorpe Avenue in Savannah, Georgia.

== Career ==
Anderson was a director of the Central of Georgia Railroad. He was also a member of both houses of the Georgia General Assembly.

== Death ==
Anderson died in 1866, aged 60 or 61, in Macon, Georgia, a year after the city was taken by Union forces during Wilson's Raid. He was interred in Laurel Grove Cemetery in Savannah. His widow survived him by two years and was buried beside him upon her death, aged 53 or 54.
