= George Anderson (merchant) =

American merchant 1767–1847

- Born: 1767; Savannah, Province of Georgia, Colonial America
- Died: May 27, 1847 (aged 79); Savannah, Georgia, U.S.
- Resting place: Laurel Grove Cemetery, Savannah, Georgia, U.S.
- Occupation: merchant
- Spouse: Elizabeth Clifford Wayne (m. 1794–1818; her death)
- Children: 10, including George Wayne Anderson, John Wayne Anderson and Edward Clifford Anderson

George Anderson (1767 – May 27, 1847) was a businessperson from Savannah, Georgia, United States. He was regarded as a highly successful merchant and "a man of much prominence in the early life of Savannah as a city."

== Life and career ==
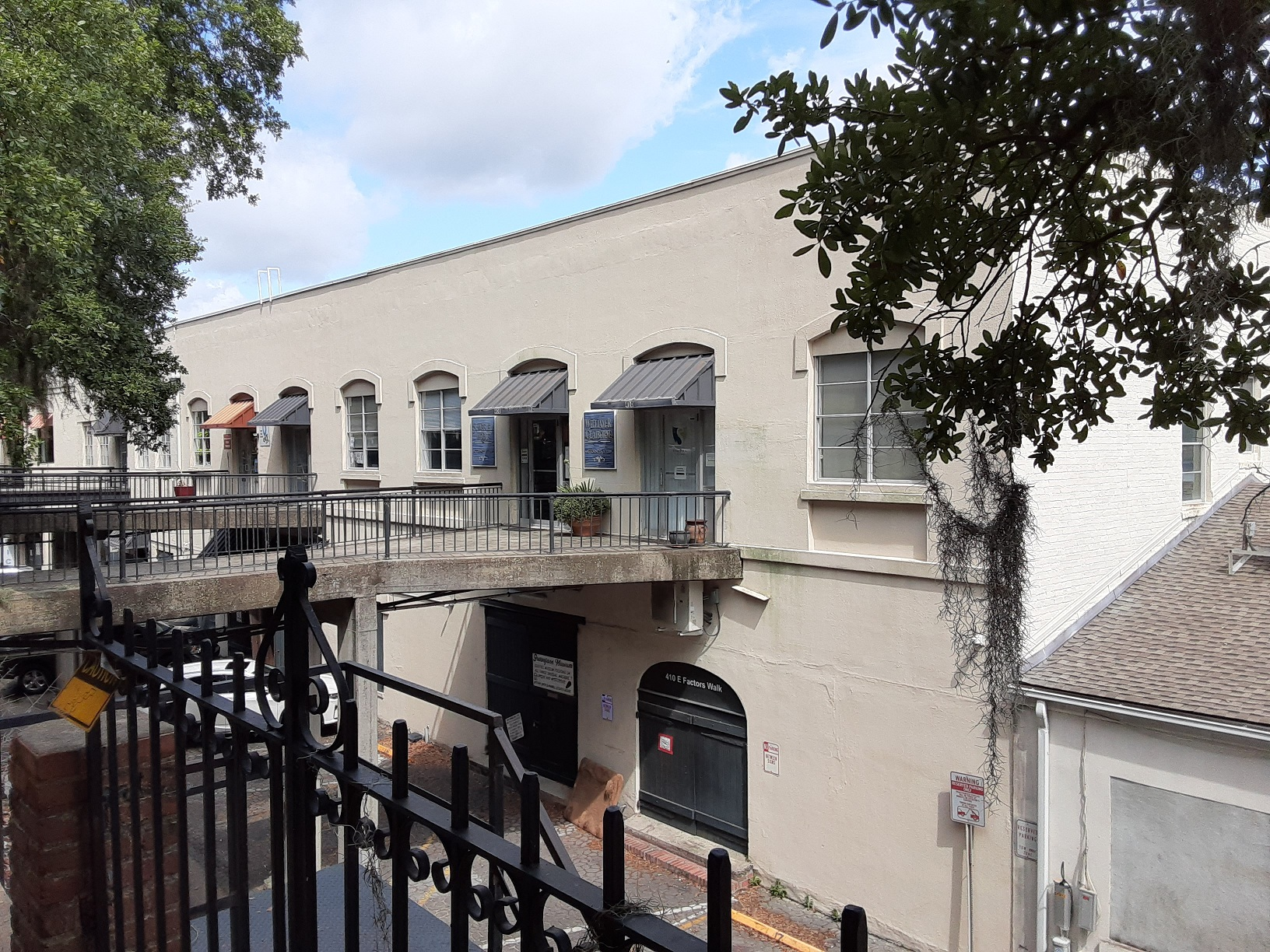
The George Anderson Stores' frontage overlooking Savannah's Factors Walk. The rear of the building, where cotton was bought and sold, is on River Street

Anderson was born in 1767 in Savannah, Province of Georgia, to George Anderson, a captain in the Confederate Navy during the American Revolutionary War, and Deborah Grant.

In 1794, Anderson married Elizabeth Clifford Wayne, a South Carolina native and a sister of the Honorable James M. Wayne, Justice of the U.S. Supreme Court. They had ten children: George, Richard, Thomas, Eliza, John, James, Georgia, Mary, Edward and Julia. Richard and Thomas died in childhood, while James and Julia died in infancy. Mary married Hugh Weedon Mercer, Confederate general in the American Civil War.

In 1823, Anderson had a cotton factor business at Richard Wayne Jr.'s wharf on Savannah's Factors Walk and River Street. Wayne was Anderson's brother-in-law. The building was reconstructed in 1835 and became known as the George Anderson Stores. In October 1817, leading cabinetmaker Duncan Phyfe's first shipment to Savannah was recorded: he shipped six boxes to George Anderson and Son, which was active from 1817 to 1839.

Anderson owned a plantation near Savannah called "Berwick", which was formerly owned by Edward Telfair.

== Death ==
Anderson died in 1847, aged 79. He was interred in Savannah's Laurel Grove Cemetery, beside his wife, whom he survived by 29 years.
