= 9 Drayton Street =

Historic building in Savannah, Georgia

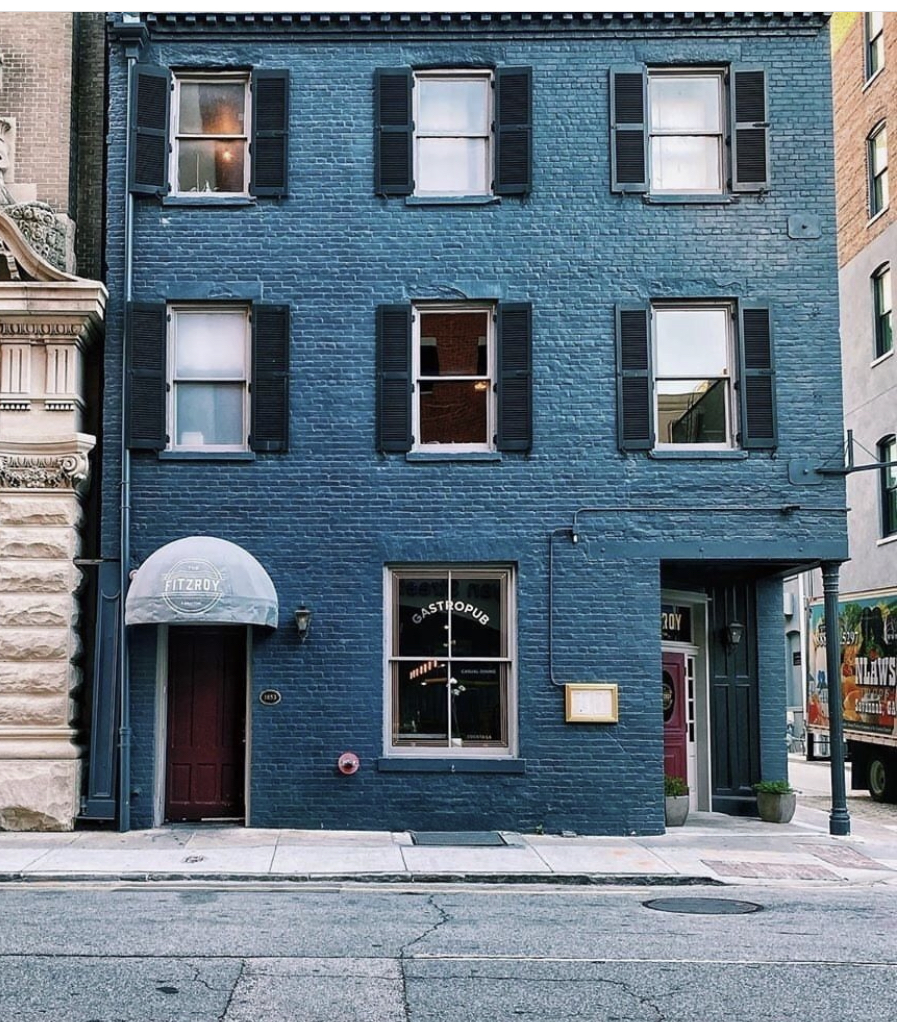
- The building's Drayton Street elevation
- Interactive map of the 9 Drayton Street area

General information
- Location: Savannah, Georgia, U.S., 9 Drayton Street
- Coordinates: 32.08020°N 81.090382°W
- Completed: 1853 (173 years ago)
- Owner: The Fitzroy

Technical details
- Floor count: 3

9 Drayton Street is a historic building in Savannah, Georgia, United States. Located in the northeastern residential/tything block of Johnson Square, part of the Savannah Historic District, the building dates from 1853.

It was built for George Wayne Anderson and later owned by his son, Confederate Army veteran Edward Clifford Anderson Jr. and officer George Mercer.

The building, which has an angled entrance at Drayton and East Bay Lane, is believed to be the oldest continuously operated saloon and restaurant in the city. An oyster bar and public house stood on the same site from 1850 and possibly earlier.

During and after the Civil War, it served as an office building and restaurant. It also has a connection to the Wanderer slave-ship scandal. Charles Lamar, mastermind of the scheme, had offices next door in the Bank of Commerce building. Richard F. Aiken, his co-conspirator, operated a bar, named the "Gem", from 9 Drayton Street after the war.

== Today ==
Churchill's Pub was located here at the time it was featured in the 1996 filming of the Clint Eastwood-directed Midnight in the Garden of Good and Evil, but it was damaged in a fire seven years later, after which it closed.

The property has been occupied since 2018 by The Fitzroy, the owners of which also run The Collins Quarter on Bull Street and The Deck Beach Bar & Kitchen on Tybee Island.
