= Walter Scott Chisholm =

American lawyer (1836–1890)

Personal details
- Born: November 17, 1836 Columbus, Georgia, U.S.
- Died: December 5, 1890 (aged 54) Manhattan, New York, U.S.
- Resting place: Bonaventure Cemetery
- Spouse: Eliza Clifford Anderson (m. 1861–1890; his death)
- Education: University of Georgia
- Occupation: Lawyer

Walter Scott Chisholm (November 17, 1836 – December 5, 1890) was an American lawyer who was eminent in Savannah, Georgia.

== Early life ==
Chisholm was born in 1836 in Columbus, Georgia, to Murdoch Chisholm, of Scottish descent, and Georgia Barnard. Both of his parents died before Chisholm was twelve.

He was schooled in Liberty County, Georgia, which was described at the time as being "that nursery of eminent men", and graduated from the University of Georgia School of Law in 1855.

== Career ==
Chisholm was admitted to the bar in Savannah, Georgia, in 1857. He formed a partnership with Julian Hartridge, then with Robert G. Erwin and another with Fleming Grantland DuBignon. He became known for having the "profoundest legal knowledge" and was involved in the biggest cases in the American South.

He also orgazined and was captain of the Savannah Cadets in the Confederate States Army early in the American Civil War. Poor health permitted his reassignment as head of the military examining board.

Chisholm was judge of the Savannah city court between 1863 and 1878.

He was president of Plant System of Railroads, and of general counsel for the Savannah, Florida and Western Railway, and the Southern Express Company.

== Personal life ==
In 1861, Anderson married Eliza Clifford Anderson, daughter of John Wayne Anderson and sister of George Wayne Anderson, a major in the United States Army. They had four children: Georgia, Sarah, Walter Jr. and Frank. Sarah died in 1883, aged 18. Walter Jr. joined formed a partnership with Erwin and DuBignon in 1889.

== Death ==
Chisholm died in 1890, aged 54, while in Manhattan, where he had been living for five years. He was interred in Savannah's Bonaventure Cemetery. His widow survived him by a decade and was buried beside him.
