= 111th Illinois Infantry Regiment =

111th Illinois Volunteer Infantry Regiment
- Illinois flag
- Active: 18 September 1862, to 7 June 1865
- Country: United States
- Allegiance: Union
- Branch: Infantry
- Engagements: Atlanta campaign Battle of Resaca; Battle of Kennesaw Mountain; Battle of Atlanta; Battle of Ezra Church; Battle of Jonesborough; March to the Sea; Carolinas campaign Battle of Bentonville

== Service ==
The 111th Illinois Volunteer Infantry Regiment was raised as part of the call for 300,000 volunteers in the summer and fall of 1862. It was filled with men from Marion County, Illinois, Washington County, Illinois, Clay County, Illinois, Wayne County, Illinois, and Clinton County, Illinois. They were organized at Salem, Illinois, and mustered into service on 18 September 1862, at Camp Marshall with 930 officers and men. They remained there for training until 31 October, then transported to Cairo, Illinois, on the Illinois Central Railroad, and thence to Columbus, Kentucky. Being attached to the Army of the Tennessee commanded by Major General Ulysses S. Grant. In December 1862 the 111th was attached to the XVI Corps under command of Major General Stephen A. Hurlbut. Their first assignment was guard duty at Columbus, Kentucky, to help ensure that new regiments and thousands of tons of supplies were safe from Confederate raiders.

In March 1863, the regiment was ordered to Fort Heiman, Kentucky, across the Tennessee River from Fort Henry, which had been captured by Grant's troops thirteen months previous. At the end of May they were transferred to Paducah, Kentucky, again guarding supplies. They remained there until the end of October when the regiment was finally ordered into active campaigning. In November they participated in the occupation of Decatur, Alabama.

As General William T. Sherman was preparing for his advance on Atlanta, Georgia, the 111th was attached to the XV Corps under General John A. Logan. In early May they advanced into northern Georgia with the rest of Sherman's army and saw fighting at the Battle of Resaca on 14 May. Seeing Rebels advancing obliquely in their front, the regiment charged and turned back the enemy advance. This was the first major battle the 111th took part in after a year and a half in the army, and although they were rookies to combat they stood and performed like the veterans that they were, suffering seven men killed and twenty-eight wounded. General Logan personally complimented the regiment for their quick action.

They took part in the Battle of Dallas during the last several days of May losing five men killed and fifteen wounded. Advancing further southward, they were lightly engaged in the Battle of New Hope Church and then took a position in front of Kennesaw Mountain in mid-June. On 27 June the advanced and participated in the Battle of Kennesaw Mountain. Their attack, like most of the other Union attacks, was bloodily repulsed by Confederates who were in heavily fortified earthworks. The continued to skirmish around Kennesaw Mountain and Marietta, Georgia, for nearly a month before advancing on Atlanta. On 22 July it seemed as though the Confederates had abandoned their trenches in front of the city, so the 111th was part of the force sent out to determine the enemy's location. After advancing near the enemy works they threw up breastworks and hoped to be the first regiment to advance into Atlanta. At about noon musketry was heard to their left and soon a division of Confederates came crashing down on the 111th. The regiment tried to hold back the enemy, but their vastly superior numbers soon forced the men to retreat. Being nearly surrounded they had to cut their way back to the rear. Their entire division had been crushed and those who were not killed or captured sped to the rear. General Logan personally rallied the men and organized a counter-attack to take back the trenches that had been lost. By nightfall, the 111th had reoccupied their entrenchments and the Union army had succeeded in turning back Hood's assault. During the Battle of Atlanta the regiment lost twenty killed, forty-five wounded, and eighty missing/captured. It was the bloodiest day in the regiment's service.

Continuing to serve in the trenches around Atlanta and fought at the Battle of Jonesborough. After the city fell into Union hands on 2 September, the regiment served as part of the occupation force. From November to December they participated in the March to the Sea and besieged Savannah, Georgia. Then they embarked on the Carolinas campaign at the end of January 1865 and participated in the capture of Columbia, South Carolina, on 17 February. As the army advanced into South Carolina they met with no serious resistance but continually skirmished with militia and scattered Confederate forces. In North Carolina they were lightly engaged in the Battle of Bentonville on 10 March and were present at Durham Station, North Carolina, when Joseph E. Johnston surrendered the troops under his command. With the rest of Sherman's army, they marched northward through the former Confederate capital of Richmond, Virginia, and encamped outside Washington, D.C., on 19 May. Five days later the 111th participated in the Grand Review of the Armies.

The 111th Illinois remained in Washington City until 7 June when they were mustered out of Federal service. On 10 June they traveled by rail to Springfield, Illinois, and were at Camp Butler until they received final pay and discharge on 27 June 1865. Regimental records show that the 111th Illinois marched 1,836 miles, traveled 1,250 miles by rail, and 650 miles on steamboats.

== Casualties ==
Killed: 7 Officers and 75 Enlisted men

Died of disease: 2 Officers and 166 Enlisted men

Total deaths: 250

== Commanders ==
Colonel James Stewart Martin

Lt Colonel Joseph F. Black

Major William H. Mabry

== Organization ==
District of Columbus, XVI Corps, Army of the Tennessee, November 1862 to November 1863

Second Brigade, Second Division, XVI Corps, Army of the Tennessee: November 1863 to March 1864

First Brigade, Second Division, XV Corps, Army of the Tennessee: March to August 1864

Second Brigade, Second Division, XV Corps, Army of the Tennessee: September 1864 to June 1865

== See also ==
- List of Illinois Civil War Units
