= George Wayne Anderson (major) =

United States Army major (1796–1872)

- Born: May 3, 1796; Savannah, Georgia, U.S.
- Died: April 25, 1872 (aged 75); Savannah, Georgia, U.S.
- Burial place: Laurel Grove Cemetery, Savannah, Georgia, U.S.
- Spouse: Eliza Clifford Stites (m. –1865; her death)
- Children: Edward Clifford Anderson Jr.
- Relatives: George Anderson (father); Edward Clifford Anderson Sr. (brother); John Wayne Anderson (brother)
- Military career
- Allegiance: United States of America
- Rank: Major
- Conflicts: War of 1812

George Wayne Anderson (May 3, 1796 – April 25, 1872) was a major in the United States Army during the War of 1812. He was also a prominent banker in Savannah, Georgia, where he was known as "a man of exceptional business ability."

== Early life ==
Anderson was born in 1796 in Savannah, Georgia, to George Anderson and Elizabeth Clifford Wayne, who was a sister of the Honorable James M. Wayne, Justice of the U.S. Supreme Court. George was their eldest child of ten, and was followed by Richard, Thomas, Eliza, John, James, Georgia, Mary, Edward and Julia. Richard and Thomas died in childhood, while James and Julia died in infancy. Mary married Hugh Weedon Mercer, Confederate general in the American Civil War.

== Career ==
In the War of 1812, Anderson was commissioned major in the United States Army.

For forty years, Anderson was president of the Planters' Bank in Savannah, which was one of the most important financial institutions in the American South prior to the Civil War. He worked with his brother-in-law, Hugh, at the bank. During the tenure of U.S. President Andrew Jackson, Anderson was invited to become the Secretary of the Treasury of the United States, but he declined the offer.

== Personal life ==
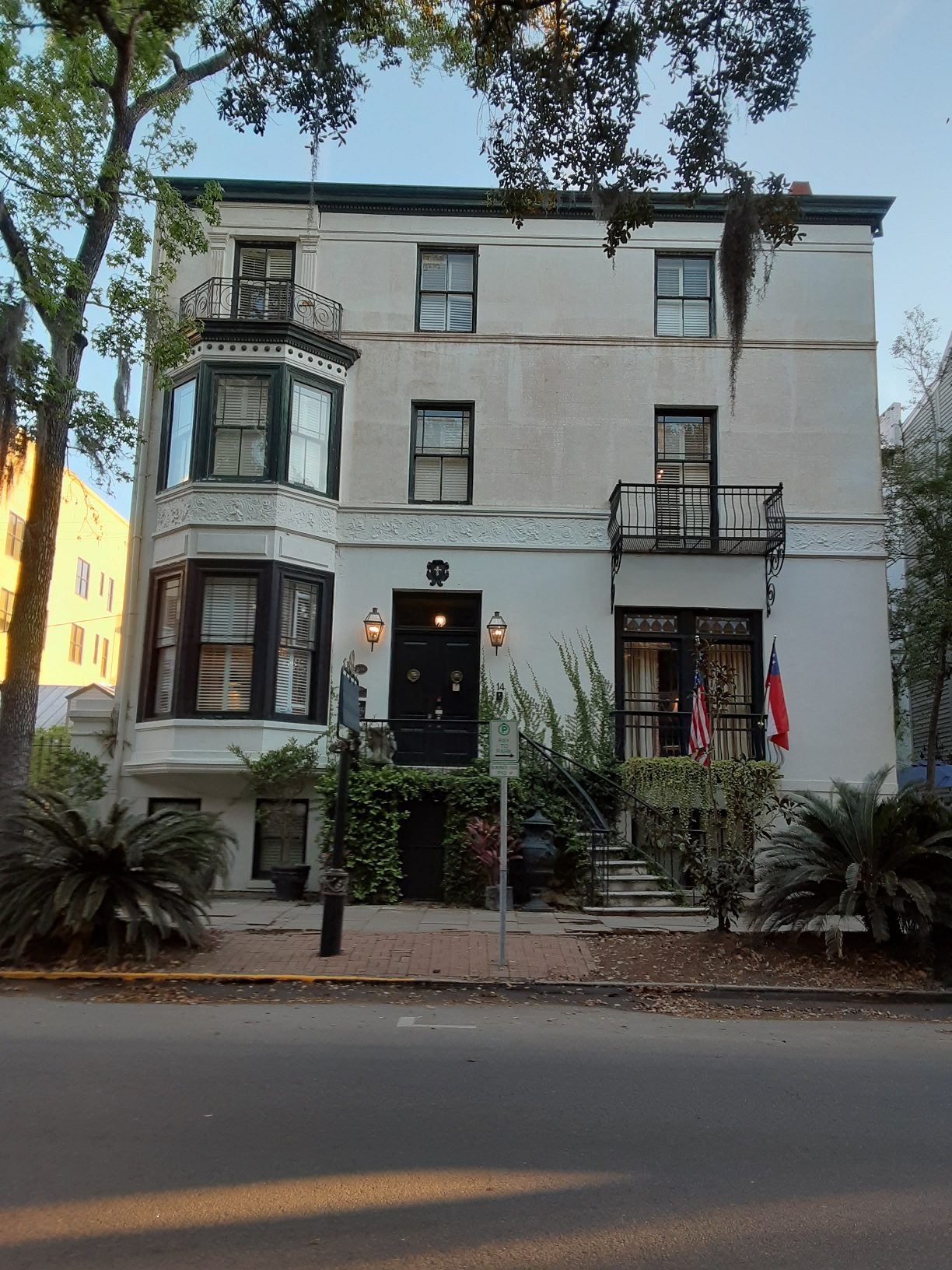
Anderson lived at 14 East Oglethorpe Avenue in Savannah

In 1820, Anderson married his first cousin, Eliza Clifford Stites. Her sister, Sarah, married William Washington Gordon. The Andersons had two children: Mary (who died in childhood) and Edward.

In 1853, Anderson had built a home at 14 East Oglethorpe Avenue in Savannah. He sold it to his brother, John, four years later.

== Death ==
Anderson died in 1872, aged 75, and was interred in Savannah's Laurel Grove Cemetery. He was interred beside his wife, who predeceased him by seven years.
