= Edward Clifford Anderson Jr. =

United States Army colonel (1839–1876)

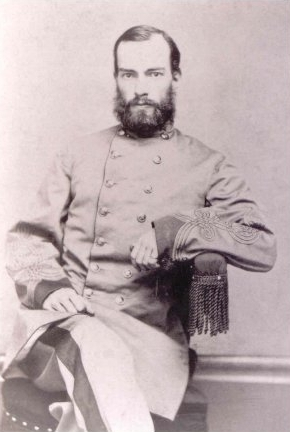
- Pictured in the early 1860s
- Born: January 7, 1839; Savannah, Georgia, U.S.
- Died: September 27, 1876 (aged 37); Guyton, Georgia, U.S.
- Burial place: Laurel Grove Cemetery, Savannah, Georgia, U.S.
- Education: University of Virginia
- Spouse: Jane Margaret Randolph (m. 1860–1876; his death)
- Relatives: George Wayne Anderson (father); Jefferson Randolph Anderson (son); Edward Clifford Anderson Sr. (uncle)
- Military career
- Conflicts: American Civil War

Edward Clifford Anderson Jr. (January 7, 1839 – September 27, 1876) was a colonel in the Confederate States Army during the American Civil War. He was wounded in action at the battle of Trevilian Station. He later became a successful banker in Savannah, Georgia.

== Early life ==
Anderson was born in 1839 in Savannah, Georgia, to George Wayne Anderson and Eliza Clifford Stites, and was named for his uncle, Edward Clifford Anderson.

He graduated from the University of Virginia School of Law in 1860.

== Career ==
A year after graduating, Anderson formed a cavalry troop, at his own expense, to assist in the Confederate States' cause during the American Civil War. As the war progressed, he became major of the 24th Georgia Battalion of Cavalry and lieutenant colonel, then colonel, of the 7th Georgia Cavalry. He was wounded in action during the battle of Trevilian Station in Virginia in 1864.

After the war, Anderson became a banker in Savannah.

== Personal life ==
In 1860, Anderson married Jane Margaret Randolph, daughter of William Mann Randolph and great-granddaughter of U.S. President Thomas Jefferson, with whom he had five children: Jefferson, George, Elizabeth, Margaret and Sarah. Jefferson became a noted attorney in Savannah.

== Death ==
Anderson died, aged 37, in Guyton, Georgia, having contracted yellow fever in Savannah's 1876 epidemic. Nellie Kinzie Gordon, wife of William Washington Gordon II, was one of the attending nurses at the hospital. He was interred in Savannah's Laurel Grove Cemetery. His widow survived him by 38 years and was buried beside him upon her death, aged 74.
