= George Wayne Anderson =

Confederate officer (1839–1906)

Major George Wayne Anderson Jr
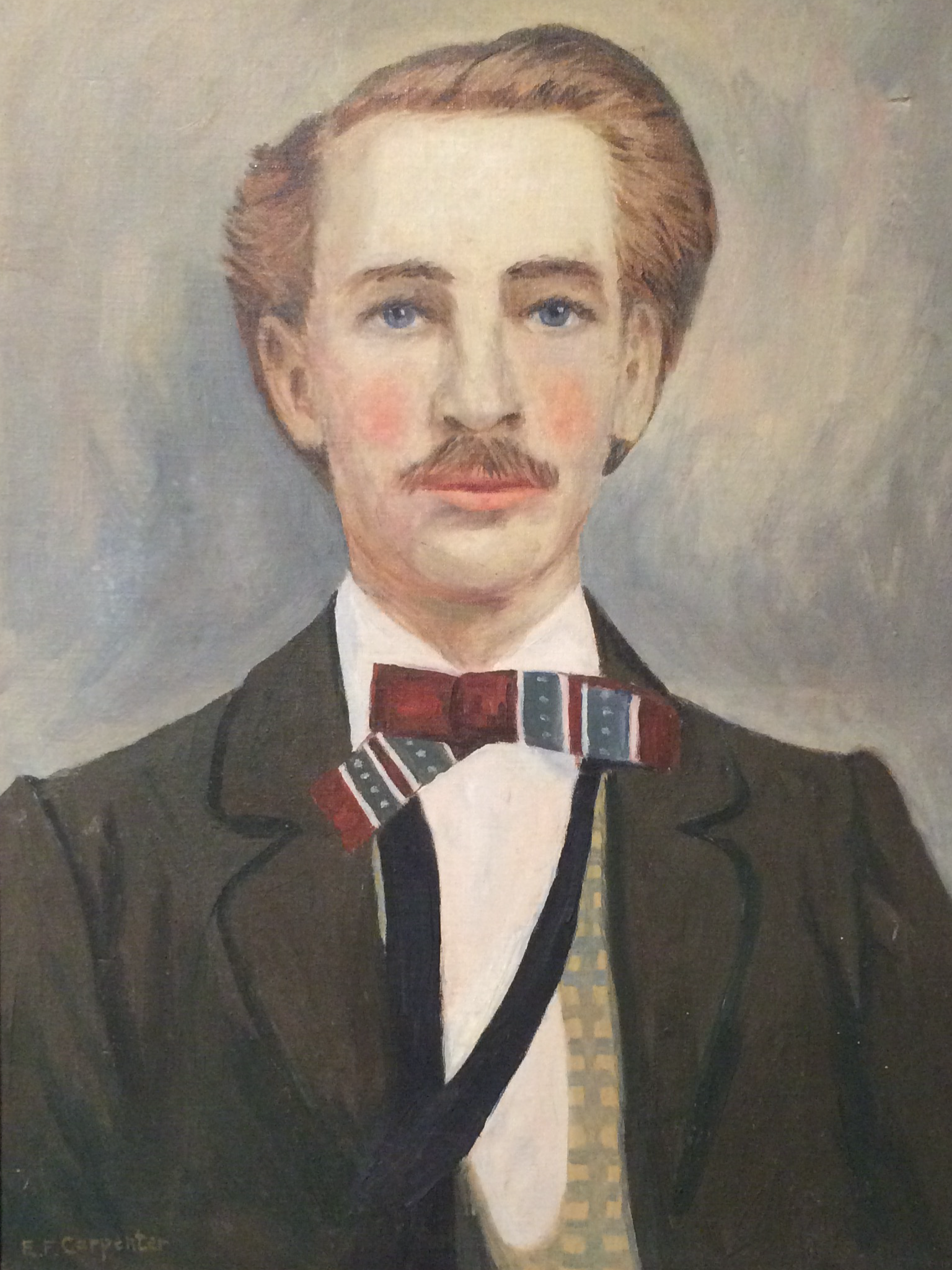
- George Wayne Anderson Jr.
- Born: August 5, 1839; Savannah, Georgia, U.S.
- Died: August 10, 1906 (aged 67); Savannah, Georgia, U.S.
- Burial place: Laurel Grove Cemetery, Savannah, Georgia, U.S.
- Military career
- Allegiance: Confederate States of America
- Branch: Confederate States Army
- Service years: 1861–1865 (CSA)
- Rank: Major (CSA)
- Commands: 1st Georgia Volunteer Infantry Co C, The Savannah Republican Blues; Chatham Artillery; Fort McAllister
- Conflicts: American Civil War: Battle of Fort McAllister (1863); Battle of Fort McAllister (1864)

George Wayne Anderson Jr. (August 5, 1839 – August 10, 1906) was an officer in the Confederate States Army during the American Civil War. He commanded the Republican Blues and later Fort McAllister near Savannah, Georgia, before its capture in 1864.

== Early life and military career ==
Anderson attended the University of Virginia from 1856 to 1859. He enlisted in the Georgia 2nd Infantry Company (nicknamed the "Republican Blues") on May 31, 1861, as a second lieutenant. Formed in Savannah, Georgia, in 1806, Republican Blues had been an existing militia organization for over fifty years before the war started. They recruited from the most prominent families in and around Savannah. The Blues visited New York City in 1860, hosted by their counterparts in the city. There was much goodwill expressed during the visit, as reported in The New York Times. Anderson was promoted to command the Blues after his uncle, John Wayne Anderson, retired in 1862. The Blues served under the U.S. flag before siding with the Confederate States of America during the Civil War, and after the war they continued their existence in the National Guard of the reunited nation.

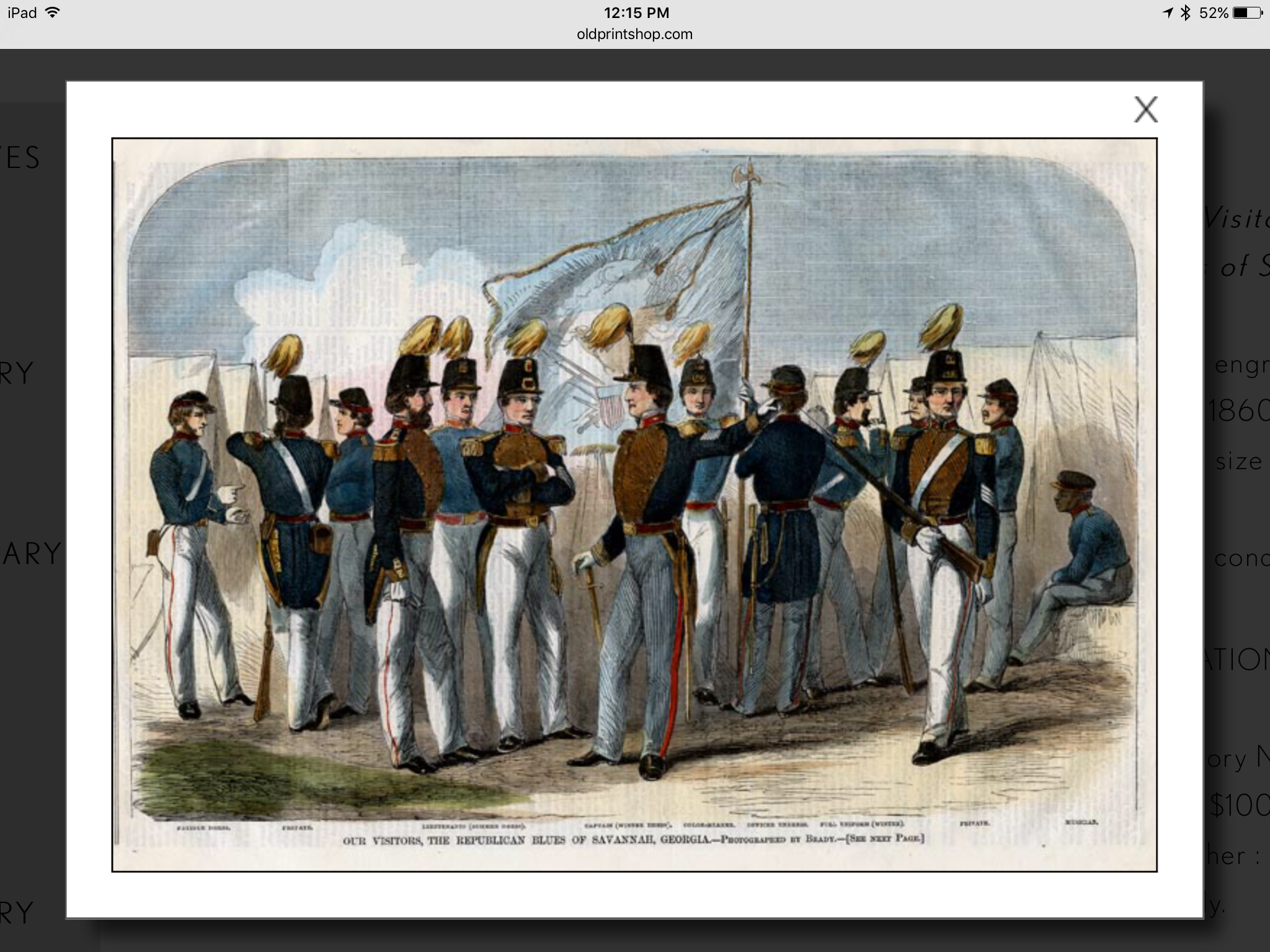
Republican Blues, 1860

== Civil War ==
Anderson and the Republican Blues were assigned to Fort McAllister in 1862 to bolster its defenses. This reunited him with his older brother, Colonel Robert H. Anderson, who commanded Fort McAllister's garrison before a promotion sent him to lead the 5th Georgia Cavalry in support of General Joseph Wheeler. George Wayne Anderson was placed in command of the fort following the death of Major John B. Gallie on February 1, 1863.

Fort McAllister was one of three forts protecting Savannah, the others being Fort Pulaski and Fort James Jackson, standing in Confederate defiance of the Union naval blockade. The southeast coast of the United States was a proving ground where both combatants tested the latest in naval artillery and coastal defenses. Fort McAllister was the key to unlocking the defenses around Savannah, one of the most important Confederate ports on the Atlantic coast. The battles there would prove to be pivotal in the war, with President Abraham Lincoln winning re-election as one result.

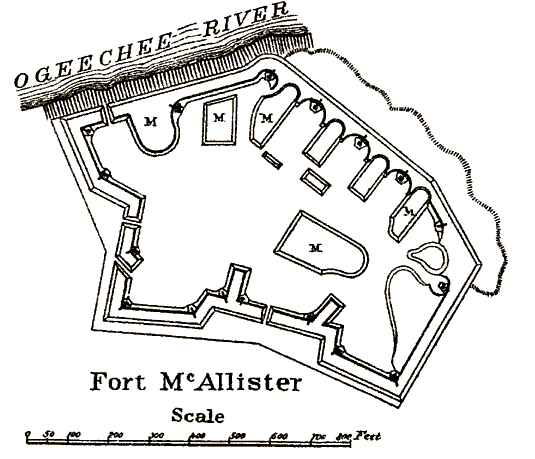
Fort McAllister layout

Union Navy Commander John Lorimer Worden, who commanded the USS Monitor when it battled the CSS Virginia in March, was placed in command of the new ironclad USS Montauk and was ordered to ready an attack on Fort McAllister. Taking advantage of the opportunity to test the new 15-inch (380 mm) Dahlgren gun and the armor of the Passaic-class ironclad for the first time, on January 27, 1863, Rear Admiral Samuel Francis Du Pont sent Montauk, along with the gunboats Seneca, Wissahickon, Dawn and the mortar schooner C. P. Williams, to bombard the fort.

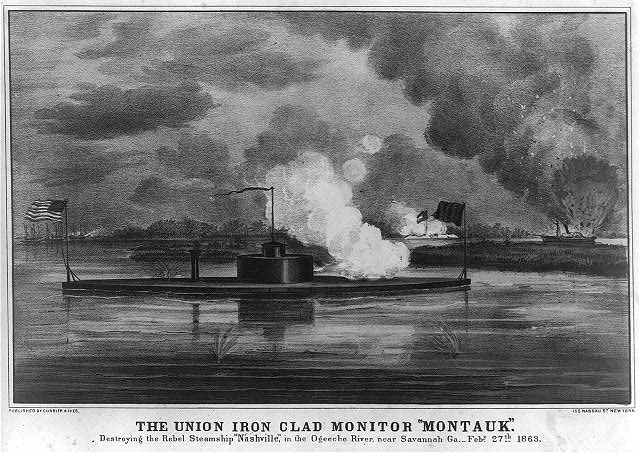
USS Montauk destroys CSS Rattlesnake at Fort McAllister

The Union was hoping that the new armament and projectiles would have as much success there as they had achieved earlier at Fort Pulaski. The new guns had reduced that fort to ruins within hours, the garrison surrendering under the incessant pounding. At Fort McAllister, however, after seven hours of fire from the monitors during the day and from the mortar boats through the night, the Union bombardment resulted in only minor damage. Only three men were wounded, but all felt the loss of the fort's mascot, Tom Cat. He died during the shelling, and today there is a marker in his honor inside the fort.

The design of Fort McAllister proved resilient, absorbing most of the impact from the shells, and the fortifications were quickly repaired overnight. Neither the heavy guns nor the ironclad ships were able to destroy the fort because it was earthwork, not made of bricks and stone. After seven unsuccessful engagements over the next year, the Union Navy retired to Ossabaw Sound to await the coming of General William Tecumseh Sherman, who had by then begun his destructive overland march through Georgia.

Anderson made the decision to defend the fort after not receiving orders or telegraph communications from General William J. Hardee regarding how he should react to Sherman's approaching army. General Sherman believed that the outcome of the entire campaign rested on capturing Fort McAllister, opening his way to the sea. To lead the attack, Sherman assigned his best, his old 2nd Division that he led at Shiloh, now commanded by General William Babcock Hazen.

=== Capture of Fort McAllister ===
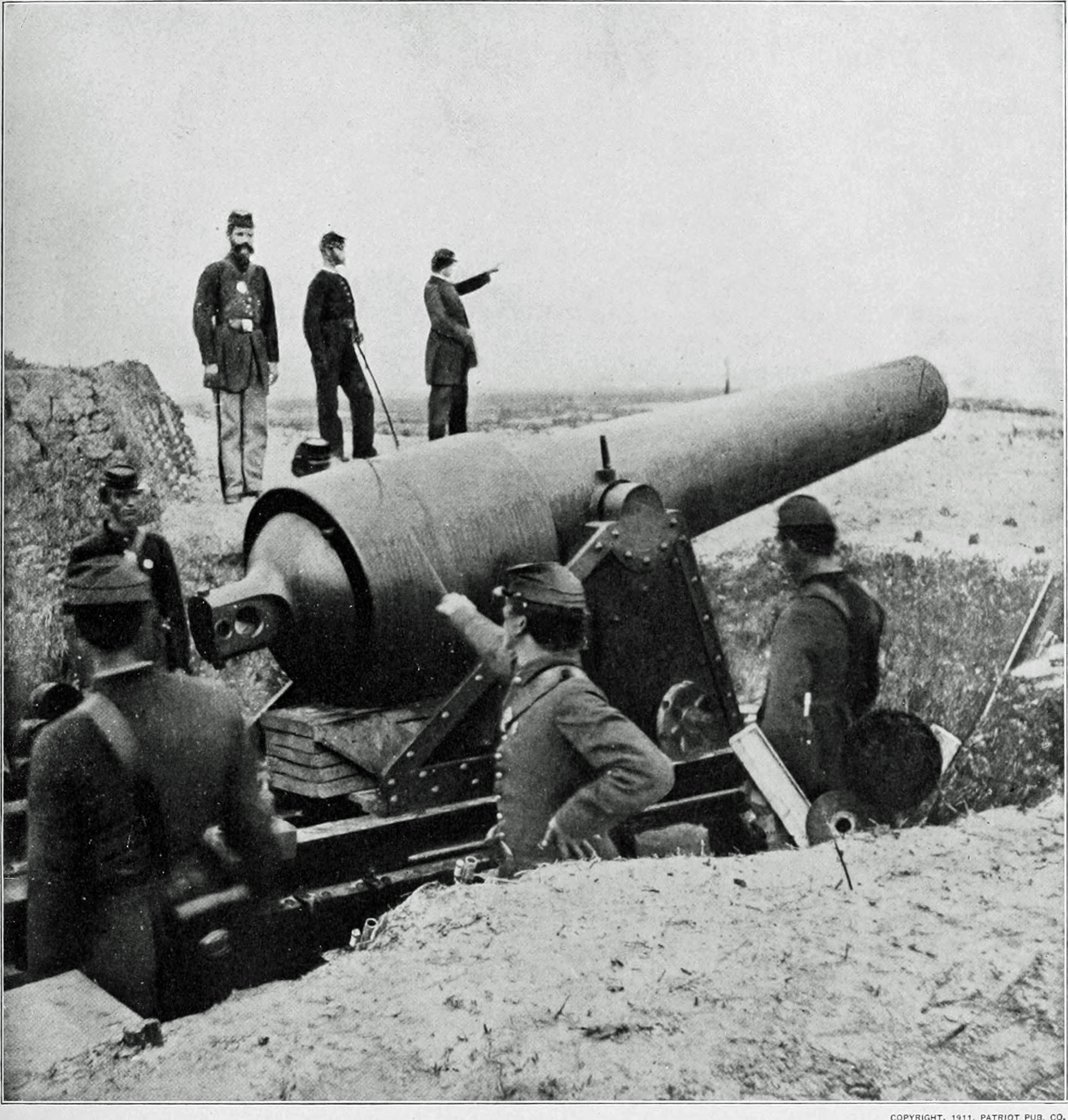
Big gun at Fort McAllister

General Sherman and his staff, along with the Signal Corps, observed the attack from Cheve's Rice Mill, about 3 miles from the fort. As they stood on the roof of the mill, waiting for the assault to commence, a staff member remarked, "George Anderson is in command, General, the flag will never be lowered. You will have to capture that fort." He knew Anderson from boyhood, and that he would not surrender, even with his forces outnumbered 25 to 1.

Fort McAllister proved not only to be resilient, but its fall gave birth to some of the kindness and compassion that would ease reconciliation. After Union forces under General Hazen's 2nd Division attacked, the 47th and 70th Ohio and the 90th and 110th Illinois overwhelmed the defenders. Attacking from all sides, as well as along the riverbank, the fight was over quickly. The battle ended after Confederate Captain Nicholas B. Clinch, engaged in ferocious hand-to-hand combat, was overwhelmed and subdued.

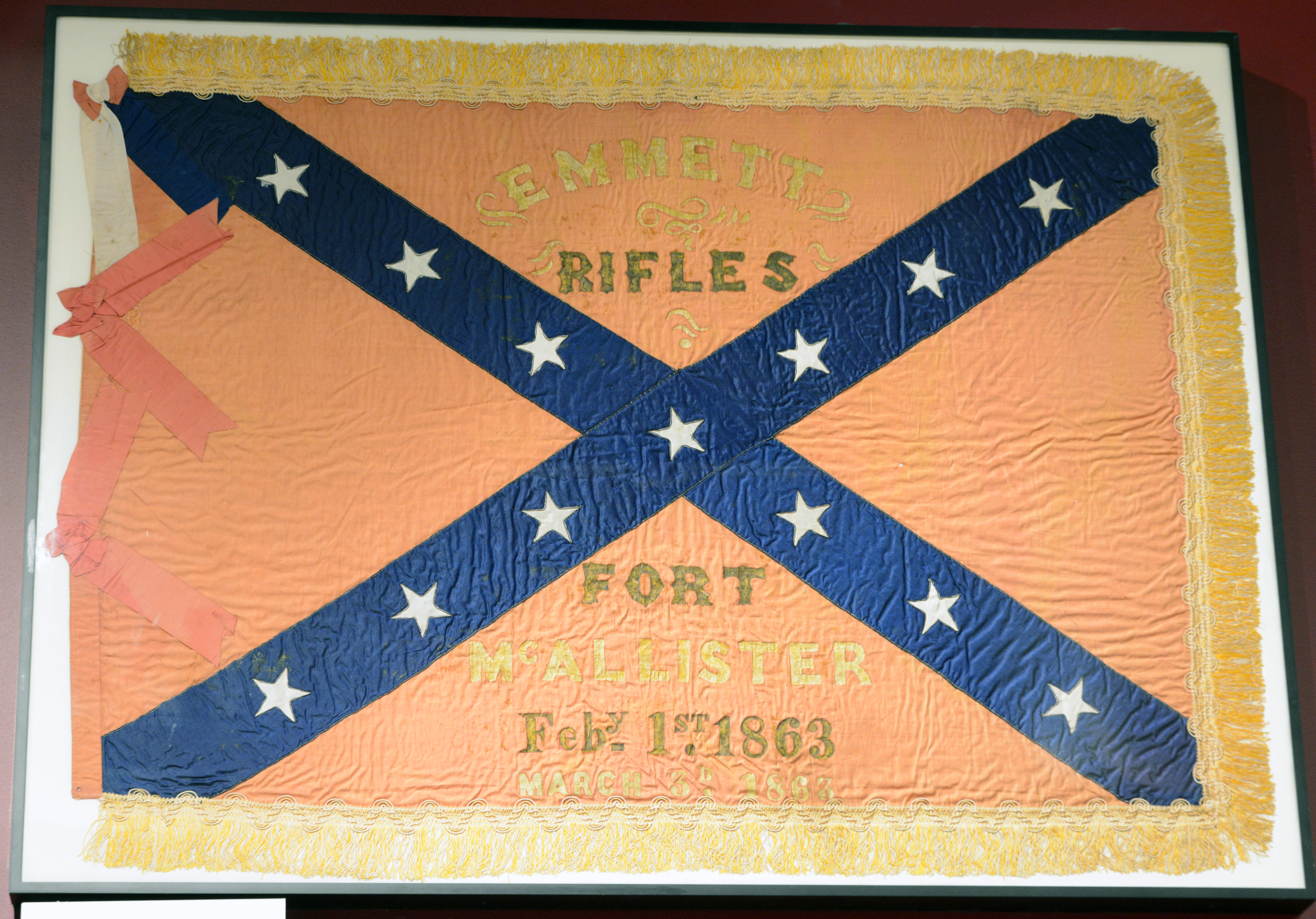
Battle flag of the Emmett Rifles having Fort McAllister as battle honor

General Hazen was one of the first Union soldiers inside the fort, where he spotted both Clinch and Anderson in the thick of the fight. Having attended the U.S. Military Academy at West Point with Anderson's older brother, General Robert H. Anderson, Hazen was familiar with both the Anderson and Clinch families in Savannah. Seeing the stunned and bleeding commander sitting on a wooden crate, Hazen spoke to him: "Major Anderson, my apologies for your rough treatment." Anderson looked up at him and said, "It's war, General. My men gave it their best, I assure you. These men were not prepared to give you anything". Hazen could see across the marsh to the rice mill where Sherman watched and waited, anxious for a signal that the fort was theirs. Looking back to Anderson he spoke, "Get to the rear, George, and report to me later." Fort McAllister is where Sherman's March to the Sea ended, and where the war ended for Major Anderson.

=== Prisoner of war ===
Anderson later recalled that the fort never surrendered but was captured by overwhelming force. Hazen agreed with Anderson's accounting of the battle, reporting that his forces fought "the garrison through the fort to their bomb-proofs, from which they still fought, and only succumbed as each man was individually overpowered." Before being confined, Anderson observed a company of Union soldiers marching out of the fort, on a course that would lead them into some buried ordnance that would have detonated under their feet. Taking their hand, Anderson led them out of harm's way. This story was fondly remembered years later in a letter from lieutenant George W. Sylvis of the 47th Ohio when he wrote to his old adversary.

With McAllister captured, Sherman's forces were able to link up with the Union Navy, delivering much-needed supplies and clearing the way to Savannah. The Confederate leadership realized the hopelessness of the situation following McAllister's capture and withdrew their remaining forces into South Carolina. In a telegram dated December 22, 1864, Sherman presented the city of Savannah as a Christmas gift to President Lincoln.

During the evening that the fort fell, Anderson was being held at the Anderson family home, Lebanon Plantation, the new headquarters of General Hazen. Hazen and Lt. Col. Strong invited Sherman to dinner to celebrate their victory. In a gesture of respect, Hazen also invited Anderson to attend the meal, after clearing the request with Sherman. The discussion was reportedly lively – during the meal Anderson engaged in a heated exchange with Sherman about the tactics employed to defend the fort and the bravery of all who fought there. Cigars were exchanged and smoked, and tributes were made to the fallen.

As a prisoner of war, Anderson was in turn sent to Hilton Head, South Carolina; Point Lookout, Maryland; and ultimately the Old Capitol Prison in Washington D.C. He was later transferred to Fort Delaware before taking an oath of alliegance to the Union on June 4, 1865, and being released under the orders of General Ulysses S. Grant. Anderson then returned to Savannah and Lebanon Plantation, just up the road from Fort McAllister.

== Postbellum career ==
Anderson worked for the W. W. Gordon company in Savannah after the war, entertaining many with stories of both the war and that "old rascal" Sherman. His older brother, Robert H. Anderson, was appointed by two post-Civil War Presidents to serve on the Board of Visitors at West Point, and served as Police Chief of Savannah for over 20 years. George Wayne Anderson died in Savannah in 1906, and is buried near his friend Major Gallie at Laurel Grove Cemetery.

== Gallery ==
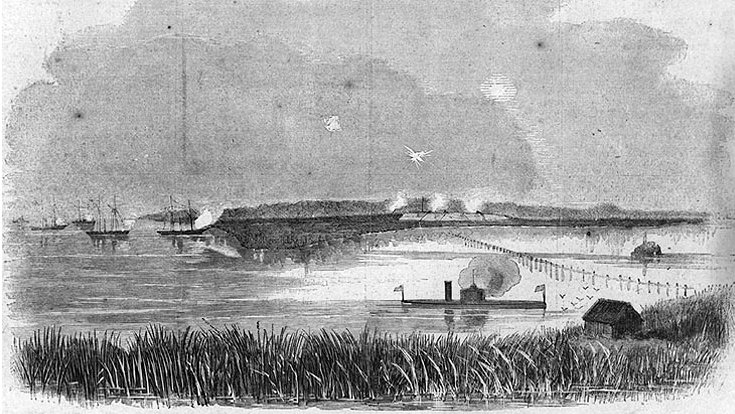
USS Montauk attacks Fort McAllister

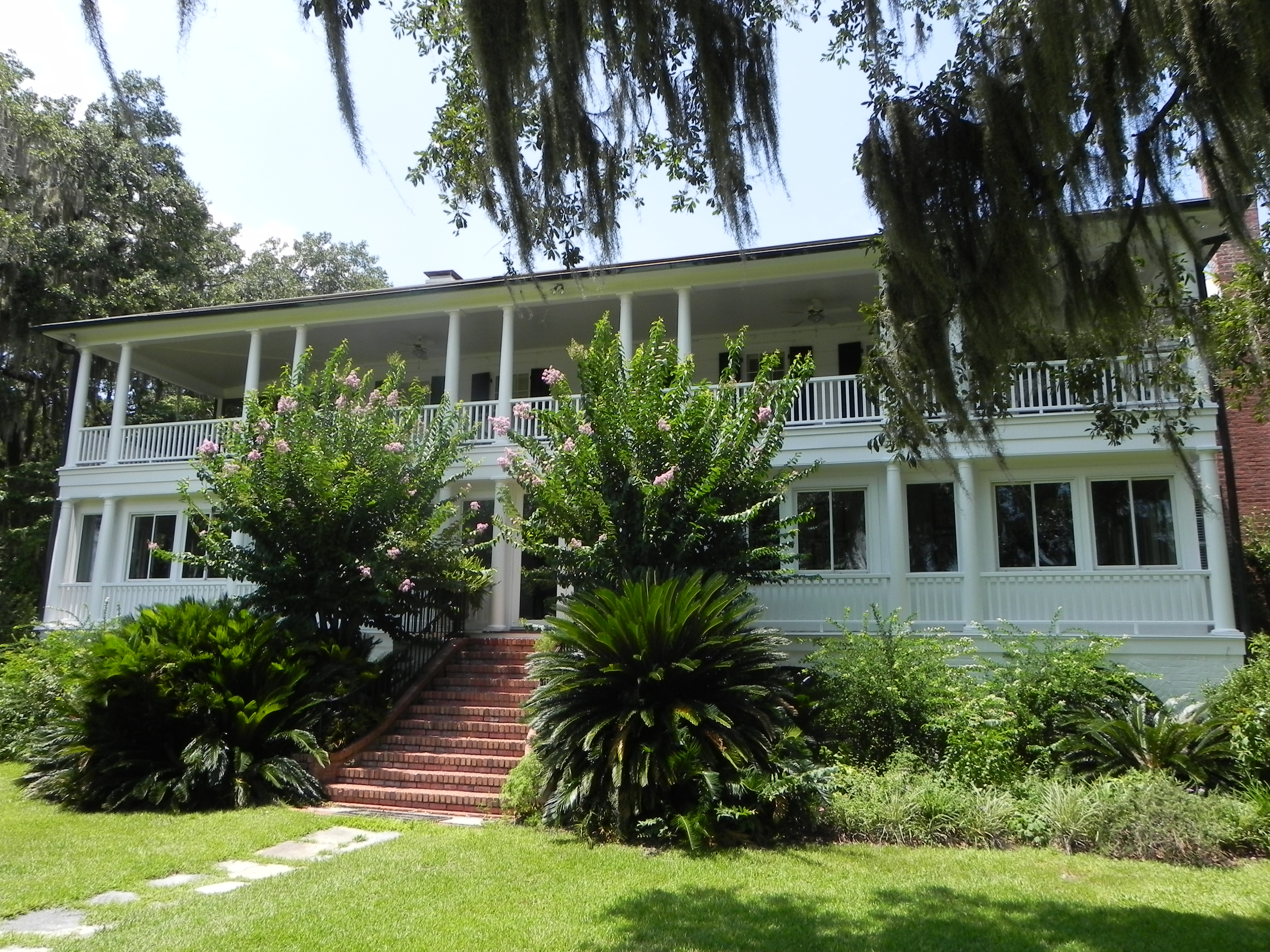
Main house at Lebanon Plantation in Savannah

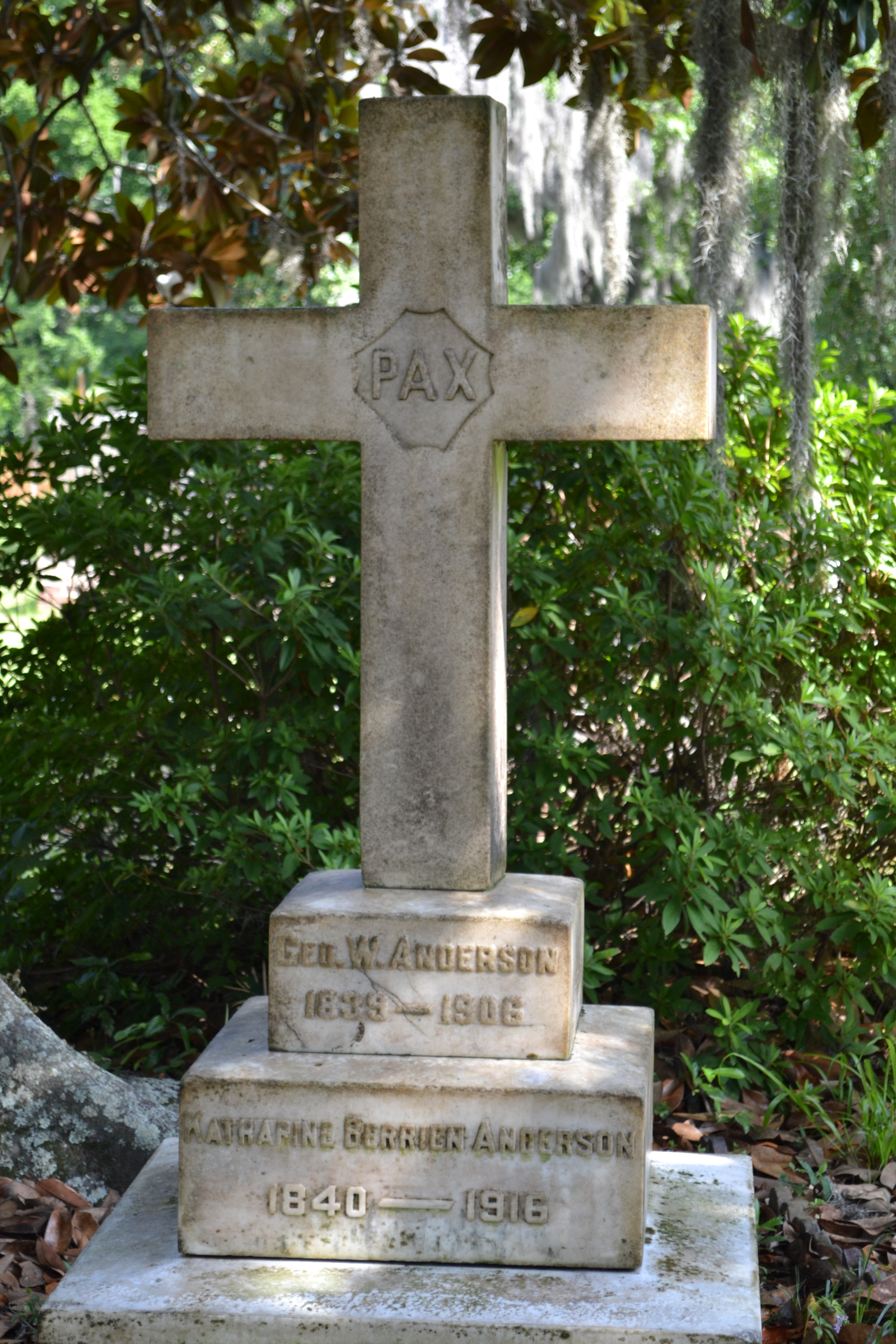
George Wayne Anderson Jr. Gravesite at Laurel Grove Cemetery in Savannah

== See also ==
- Battle of Fort McAllister (1863)
- Battle of Fort McAllister (1864)
- Republican Blues
- 9 Drayton Street, built for Anderson
