= Midnight in the Garden of Good and Evil (musical) =

2024 American musical

- The Musical
- World Premiere Production Poster
- Music: Jason Robert Brown
- Lyrics: Jason Robert Brown
- Book: Taylor Mac
- Setting: 1980s Savannah, Georgia, U.S.
- Basis: Novel Midnight in the Garden of Good and Evil by John Berendt
- Premiere: July 8, 2024: Goodman Theatre
- Productions: 2024 Chicago

Midnight in the Garden of Good and Evil is a musical with music and lyrics by Jason Robert Brown and a book by Taylor Mac. Based on John Berendt's 1994 non-fiction novel of the same name, it premiered on July 8, 2024, at the Goodman Theatre in Chicago. The musical follows an antiques dealer who is on trial for the murder of a male prostitute in Savannah, Georgia, U.S., based on the killing of Danny Hansford. A Broadway run was announced for 2025 but has not yet come to fruition.

== Development ==
In 2012, it was reported that producer Anne Hamburger had enlisted playwright Alfred Uhry to adapt Berendt's novel into a stage musical, which would make use of music from Johnny Mercer's catalogue. In 2013, Rob Ashford was attached to direct the production, which aimed for a tryout either in the U.S. or London in late 2014, with a Broadway debut eyed for the first half of 2015. A reading took place in 2014, with Tony Goldwyn, Leslie Uggams, and Jessica Molaskey leading the cast. The adaptation was then shelved.

In February 2023, it was announced that Brown and Mac would be involved in the development of the musical stage adaptation, with a reading held in May. The creators of the musical eventually realized that Mercer songs alone would not be able drive the story forward so Brown was brought in to write original musical numbers. Brown initially declined the first time he was approached, as he could not envision adapting it as a musical. In the musical, the audience plays the role of John Berendt, the author, and characters often break the fourth wall. Berendt was not involved with writing the musical's book, although he and Mac met a number of times for dinner, where he was able to discuss stories that were not included in the novel and events following its publication. The production team also visited Savannah numerous times to immerse themselves in the show's setting. In addition, a number of Savannahians, such as Stratton Leopold, were invited to readings and workshops to provide feedback on the script's authenticity. Williams's nieces, who manage Mercer House, were also consulted.

== Musical numbers ==
Act 1

- "Bonaventure" – Minerva, Jim Williams, the Lady Chablis, Emma Dawes, and Company
- "Mercer House" – Jim Williams, Emma Dawes, and Preservation League Ladies
- "The Shed Shack" – the Lady Chablis and Company
- "Let There Be Light" – the Lady Chablis and Company
- "Savannah Is Restored" – Emma Dawes and Preservation League Ladies
- "Since My Mama Died" – Alma Knox Carter
- "Jim and Danny" – Jim Williams and Danny Hansford
- "Lift Her Up" – Bobby Hutchins and Company
- "The Empress of Savannah" – Jack the One-Eyed Jill
- "Finale Act 1" – Minerva, Emma Dawes, Jim Williams, Corinne Strong, Danny Hansford, and Company

Act 2

- "True Crime" – the Lady Chablis and Jack the One-Eyed Jill
- "Sad House" – Emma Dawes and Preservation League Ladies
- "What a Ride" – Jim Williams and Minerva
- "Reasonable Doubt" – Jim Williams and Company
- "Clap on One and Three" – Lavella Cole and Company
- "It Takes Your Breath Away" – Emma Dawes
- "Restoration" – Jim Williams and the Lady Chablis
- "Rotten to the Core" – Minerva, Jim Williams, Danny Hansford, and Company
- "Butterflies" – the Lady Chablis and Company

== Productions ==
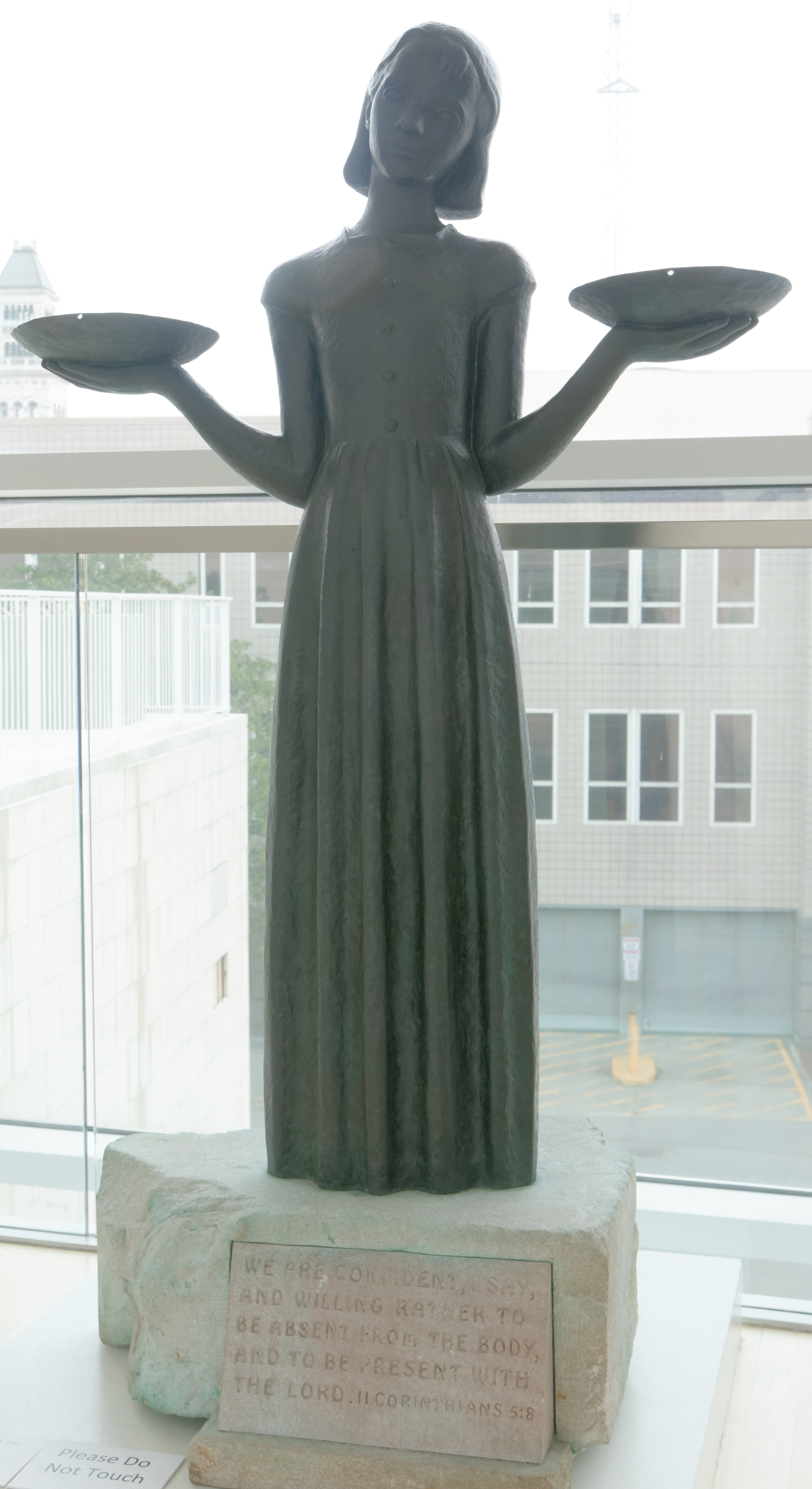
The Bird Girl sculpture (by Sylvia Shaw Judson), which appears on the cover of the 1994 novel, is also featured in the show's posters and playbill. The Chicago production's scenery used the same fiberglass replica created for the 1997 film adaptation and loaned from the Cliff Dwellers Club.

=== Chicago (2024) ===
The Chicago production ran from July 8 to August 11, 2024, at the Goodman Theatre, following previews that started on June 25 at the Albert Theatre. It was directed by Rob Ashford, choreographed by Tanya Birl-Torres, and starred J. Harrison Ghee as the Lady Chablis, Tom Hewitt as Jim Williams, and Sierra Boggess as Emma Dawes. The production had sets by Christopher Oram, costumes by Toni-Leslie James, lighting by Neil Austin & Jamie Platt, and sound design by Jon Weston.

=== Broadway (TBA) ===
In September 2024, it was announced that the production would debut on Broadway in 2025. However, no further information has been announced at this time.

== Cast and characters ==
Character	Chicago
Character	2024
The Lady Chablis	J. Harrison Ghee
Jim Williams	Tom Hewitt
Emma Dawes	Sierra Boggess
Minerva	Brianna Buckley
Vera Strong	McKinley Carter
Corinne Strong	Bailee Endebrock
Serena Barnes	Mary Ernster
Alma Knox Carter	Jessica Molaskey
Bobby Hutchins	Lance Roberts

== Critical reception ==
The Chicago production received positive reviews, especially for Ghee's performance as Chablis. Variety's Steven Oxman praised Brown's "best score to date", as well as the performances of Ghee (as a "triple threat performer ... at the top of their game") and Hewitt. Charles Isherwood of The Wall Street Journal also praised the performances of the cast but had some criticism for the problems resulting from the adaptation of a digressive novel for the stage. Benjamin Payne of Georgia Public Broadcasting praised Ghee's performance, as well as the set design, music, and choreography, with the biggest weak point noted as the absence of showing a 1980s jury in the Deep South deliberating on the verdict of a gay man on trial for murdering a bisexual man. Chris Jones of the Chicago Tribune noted Ghee's performance and Brown's score as the production's two strengths but noted the show's weakness was its lack of a credible conflict. Elisabeth Vincentelli of The New York Times felt that Brown's score was not as strong as his work for The Bridges of Madison County, and felt that Ashford and Birl-Torres were "overall too timid in the splashier scenes", ultimately calling the show "as intriguing as it is unwieldy, and so close to working".

== See also ==
- Midnight in the Garden of Good and Evil (film), 1997 American film adaptation of the novel
