= Spencer Lawton =

American district attorney for Georgia (1943–2024)

District attorney for Chatham County, Georgia
- In office 1981–2008

Personal details
- Born: July 19, 1943 Detroit, Michigan, U.S.
- Died: November 13, 2024 (aged 81) Savannah, Georgia, U.S.
- Spouse: Ann Woolner (m. 2008)
- Children: 1
- Education: University of Georgia School of Law; Tulane University
- Occupation: Attorney, journalist

Spencer Lawton Jr. (July 19, 1943 – November 13, 2024) was an American attorney. He was district attorney for Chatham County, Georgia, between 1981 and 2008, and for the Eastern Judicial Circuit. He was known for serving as the prosecutor of preservationist James Arthur Williams in his trial for the alleged murder of Danny Hansford.

== Early life ==
Lawton was born on July 19, 1943 in Detroit, Michigan, to Spencer Lawton Sr. (1918–1999) and Sarah "Sally" Parker (1919–2017). He was their eldest son. After being raised in Savannah, Georgia, Lawton moved with his family to Atlanta. He graduated from Woodberry Forest School in Orange, Virginia.

He began at the University of Georgia (UGA) in 1961. He served in the U.S. Air Force between 1962 and 1966. After the Air Force, he studied at Tulane University and graduated with a science degree. He returned to UGA for law school and graduated in 1971, after which he began working for Lawton, Sipple and Chamlee, a firm begun by his great-grandfather.

== Legal career ==
In 1976, with his college friend Michael Karpf, he established a firm and practiced general law. In 1981, he became the district attorney for Chatham County, Georgia.

Lawton came to prominence as the prosecutor of preservationist James Arthur Williams in his trial for the alleged murder of Danny Hansford, a story documented in John Berendt's 1994 book Midnight in the Garden of Good and Evil. Lawton was renamed Finley Largent in the 1997 movie adaptation, a role played by Bob Gunton. Lawton was assisted by Dep Kirkland in the first of the four trials.

In 2008, Lawton was named District Attorney of the Year by the District Attorney's Association of Georgia.

Upon his retirement, Lawton was succeeded by Larry Chisholm. He later became a journalist for his hometown newspaper, Savannah Morning News.

== Personal life and death ==
Lawton married Ann Woolner in 2008. They had a daughter. Through his grandmother, he was a descendent of Spencer Proudfoot Shotter (1855–1920), a Canadian business magnate. He was also a relative of Alexander Lawton, a Confederate Army general and lawyer.

Lawton died on November 13, 2024 at his home in Savannah, Georgia, from heart disease, aged 81.
