= John R. Wilder =

American businessman (1816–1879)

John Randolph Wilder
- Born: March 18, 1816; Leicester, Massachusetts, U.S.
- Died: November 1, 1879 (aged 63); Savannah, Georgia, U.S.
- Resting place: Laurel Grove Cemetery
- Occupation: businessman

John Randolph Wilder (March 18, 1816 – November 1, 1879) was an American businessman based in Savannah, Georgia, where he was a prominent civic leader, cotton merchant and planter. His shipping and cotton exporting houses were regarded as some of the leading businesses in Savannah. He was also a slave-owner.

== Life and career ==
A descendent of Captain Thomas Wilder, who served in King William's War, Wilder was born in 1816 in Leicester, Massachusetts, to John Wilder and Lucinda A. Washburn.

He married Anna Drucilla Lewis in 1840.

After moving to Savannah, Georgia, Wilder went into the cotton business with his only child, son Joseph John, who was born on January 5, 1844. Joseph continued the business after his father's death; it was known for a period as Wilder & Fullerton, then J. J. Wilder & Co.

In 1868, Wilder and his family purchased what is now known as Mercer House, in Savannah's Monterey Square, from General Hugh W. Mercer, great-grandfather of Savannahian songwriter Johnny Mercer.

He became consul of the Russian government in Savannah, a role which his son later inherited.

Wilder studied in Germany during much of the American Civil War of 1861–1865.

The Wilder family owned around 325 acres (132 ha) of land in the Oakton district of Marietta, Georgia, where they summered up until the outbreak of the Civil War.

== Death ==
Wilder died in Marietta in 1879, aged 63. He was interred in Savannah's Laurel Grove Cemetery, alongside his wife, who preceded him in death by two years.
