= Dep Kirkland =

American police officer (1949–2022)

- Born: Deppish Kirkland III; November 9, 1949; Savannah, Georgia, U.S.
- Died: September 3, 2022 (aged 72)
- Burial place: Bonaventure Cemetery, Savannah, Georgia, U.S.
- Occupation: Law enforcement officer

Deppish Kirkland III (November 9, 1949 – September 4, 2022) was an American law enforcement officer and lawyer. In 1981, when he was chief assistant district attorney of Chatham County, Georgia, he took Jim Williams into custody for the alleged murder of Danny Hansford. The killing was the central story of John Berendt's 1994 book Midnight in the Garden of Good and Evil.

He was also an actor, writer and director.

== Early life ==
Kirkland was born in 1949 in Savannah, Georgia, to Deppish Kirkland Jr. and Mertice Keiffer. He grew up on Wilmington Island, Georgia, and attended Savannah High School. He studied law at the University of Georgia, graduating in 1975.

== Career ==
Kirkland went into law practice in Savannah and Atlanta in the late 1970s. He gained admittance to practice in the law courts of state and federal institutions, including the Supreme Court of the United States.

In the early hours of May 2, 1981, Kirkland was called out to Savannah's Mercer House, the home of preservationist Jim Williams, who had shot Danny Hansford in the mansion's study. Kirkland worked on the first trial but had relocated to Atlanta before the three further trials occurred, concluding with Williams's acquittal in 1989. In Atlanta, he worked under politician Joe Frank Harris as Consumer Utility Counsel. He later went on to establish the first Anti-Piracy Task Force, based in Washington, D.C., where he was also a member of the bar association (as he was in Georgia).

He relocated to New York City, where he worked as an actor, writer and director.

By the early 2000s, Kirkland was based in Los Angeles, serving as chairman of Isle of Hope Entertainment.

In 2005, he published a book titled Lawyer Games: After Midnight in the Garden of Good and Evil.

== Personal life ==
Kirkland had two daughters.

== Death ==
Kirkland died in 2022, aged 72, having drowned in a boating accident near Bear Creek on Lake Jackson, Georgia. The driver of the boat was arrested for operating while under the influence. Kirkland was working on a film adaptation of MsTRIAL, a play he had written which had been produced in Los Angeles and New York City. He was interred in Savannah's Bonaventure Cemetery.
