= J. Harrison Ghee =

American musical theatre actor

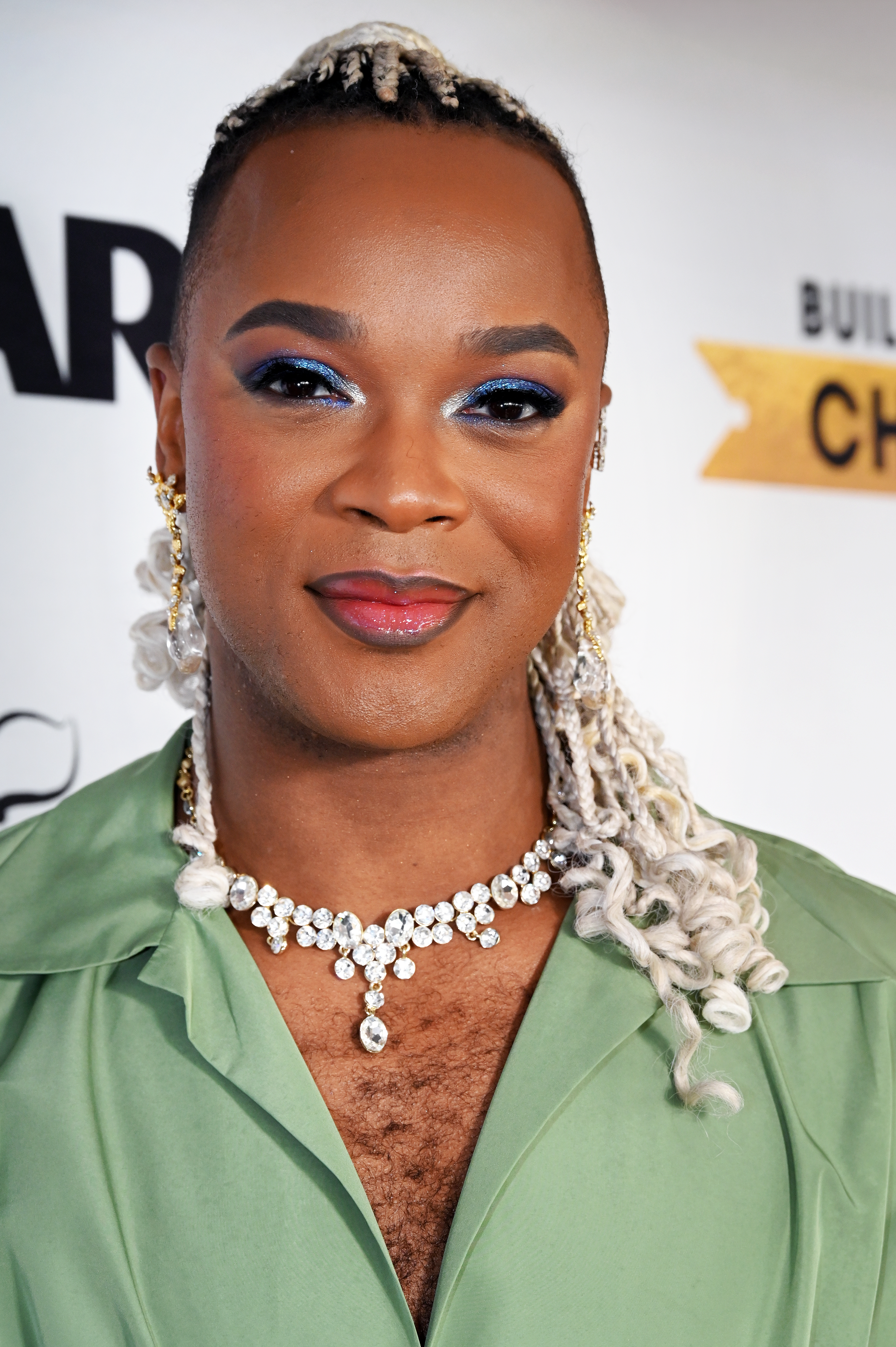
- Ghee in 2026
- Born: June 16, 1989 (age 37); Fayetteville, North Carolina, U.S.
- Education: American Musical and Dramatic Academy
- Occupations: Actor, singer, dancer
- Awards: Tony Award for Best Actor in a Musical

J. Harrison Ghee (born June 16, 1989) is an American actor, singer, and dancer, best known for their work on Broadway. They (Note: Ghee uses she/her, he/him, and they/them pronouns. This article uses they/them for consistency.) first received recognition for their performance as Lola in Kinky Boots. In December 2022, they originated the role of Jerry/Daphne in Some Like It Hot, a stage musical based on the 1959 film of the same name. They won the 2023 Tony Award for Best Actor in a Musical at the 76th Tony Awards for their performance, and with Alex Newell became the first openly nonbinary actors to be nominated for and to win a Tony Award. In 2024, they won the Grammy Award for Best Musical Theater Album at the 66th Annual Grammy Awards.

They originated the role of Andre Mayem in the musical Mrs. Doubtfire on Broadway, a role they also played in the 5th Avenue Theatre in 2019.

== Early life ==
J. Harrison Ghee grew up the child of a Southern Baptist pastor and an educator in Fayetteville, North Carolina. They began playing cello in elementary school, later switching to play the bass. Ghee then learned to play trombone, so that they could be in the E. E. Smith High School marching band. After graduating high school in 2007, Ghee attended the American Musical and Dramatic Academy. Ghee first tried drag in college when they played a female wrestler.

== Career ==
In 2011, Ghee appeared as part of the ensemble in the Off-Broadway musical Little House on the Ferry, a contemporary gay love story set in Fire Island Pines, New York. The production also featured performers Seph Stanek, Colton Ford, and Kit Balcuns.

Ghee began working professionally at Tokyo Disneyland and on cruise ships. While in Tokyo, Ghee began creating their drag persona, Crystal Demure. When Ghee went to audition for Motown, they took the opportunity to share with the casting directors, who also worked on Kinky Boots, their story and connection with the Kinky Boots character Lola and were eventually cast as Lola in their Broadway debut. Ghee was the first established drag performer to take on the role. Ghee eventually joined the national touring production of the show.

Ghee joined the cast of Mrs. Doubtfire, and began previews before the 2020 closing of Broadway. In 2021, Ghee performed as Velma Kelly in The Muny's production of Chicago, before originating the role of Andre Mayem when Mrs. Doubtfire opened. In 2022, Ghee joined the cast of Some Like It Hot. They are playing Jerry/Daphne, the role played by Jack Lemmon in the film. In 2023, Ghee and Alex Newell became the first openly non-binary actors to be nominated for and win a Tony Award when Ghee won Best Actor in a Musical and Newell won Best Featured Actor in a Musical for Shucked at the 76th Tony Awards. In 2023, they were named as one of OUT Magazine's Out 100. In 2024, it was announced they would lead as the Lady Chablis in Jason Robert Brown and Taylor Mac's production of Midnight in the Garden of Good and Evil. That same year, they starred as the Jester in Encores!’s production of Once Upon a Mattress at New York City Center.

They starred in the Broadway production of Hadestown as Hermes from March to August of 2026. In 2026 Ghee was cast in the US national tour of Oh, Mary!. They were scheduled to star first as Mary's husband starting in September 2026, then as Mary beginning in January 2027. Due to health reasons Ghee's debut was pushed back to November 2026 before they ultimately withdrew from the tour altogether.

== Personal life ==
Ghee is non-binary and pansexual, and uses he/she/they pronouns.

Ghee was diagnosed with kidney disease in 2022, and as of 2026 is on the waiting list for a transplant.

== Filmography ==
=== Film and television ===
Year	Title	Role	Notes
2018	High Maintenance	Carl	Episode: "Globo"
2019–22	Raising Dion	Kwame	12 episodes
2021	Over My Dead Body	Jackée	Short film
2023	Accused	Kevin Milstead/Robyn Blind	Episode: "Robyn's Story"
2026	Stumble	Charleston Sergeant	Episode: "Lorraine"

=== Music videos ===
Year	Title	Role	Artist
2019	"Be Not Afraid"	Dancer	Heather Mae

== Stage credits ==
Year	Title	Role	Venue	Ref.
2011	Little House on the Ferry	Performer	Off-Off-Broadway, American Theatre of Actors	
2015	Kinky Boots	Lola (replacement)	U.S. National Tour	
2017	Kinky Boots	Lola (replacement)	Broadway, Al Hirschfeld Theatre	
2018	The Sting	Johnny Hooker	Regional, Paper Mill Playhouse	
2019	Mrs. Doubtfire	Andre Mayem	Regional, 5th Avenue Theatre	
2021	Chicago	Velma Kelly	Regional, The Muny	
2022	Mrs. Doubtfire	Andre Mayem	Broadway, Stephen Sondheim Theatre	
2022	Some Like It Hot	Jerry/Daphne	Broadway, Shubert Theatre	
2024	Midnight in the Garden of Good and Evil	The Lady Chablis	Regional, Goodman Theatre	
2024	Once Upon a Mattress	Jester	Off-Broadway, New York City Center Encores!	
2025	Saturday Church	Ensemble	Off-Broadway, New York Theatre Workshop	
2026	Hadestown	Hermes (replacement)	Broadway, Walter Kerr Theatre	

== Awards and nominations ==
Year	Award	Category	Work	Result	Ref
2023	Tony Award	Best Actor in a Musical	Some Like It Hot	Won	
2023	Drama Desk Award	Outstanding Lead Performance in a Musical	Some Like It Hot	Won	
2023	Drama League Award	Distinguished Performance	Some Like It Hot	Nominated	
2023	Outer Critics Circle Award	Outstanding Lead Performer in a Broadway Musical	Some Like It Hot	Won	
2023	Chita Rivera Award	Outstanding Dancer in a Broadway Show	Some Like It Hot	Nominated	
2024	Grammy Awards	Best Musical Theater Album	Some Like It Hot	Won	
2026	Lucille Lortel Award	Outstanding Lead Performer in a Musical	Saturday Church	Nominated	
2026	Outer Critics Circle Award	Outstanding Featured Performer in an Off-Broadway Musical	Saturday Church	Nominated	
