= Killing of Danny Hansford =

American killing and murder trial

Danny Hansford
- Born: Danny Lewis Hanford; March 1, 1960; Savannah, Georgia, U.S.
- Died: May 2, 1981 (aged 21); Savannah, Georgia, U.S.
- Burial place: Greenwich Cemetery, Savannah, Georgia, U.S.
- Occupation: Tradesman

Danny Lewis Hansford (March 1, 1960 – May 2, 1981) was shot and killed by historic preservationist and antiques dealer Jim Williams at Williams's Mercer House home in Savannah, Georgia, United States. Williams claimed that he shot Hansford in self-defense. In 1989, after four trials, Williams was acquitted of Hansford's murder. The event was recounted in John Berendt's 1994 non-fiction book Midnight in the Garden of Good and Evil, its 1997 film adaptation, and its 2024 musical stage adaptation.

== Early life ==
Danny Hansford was born in 1960 in Savannah, Georgia, to Emily Bannister. He was one of three sons, the others being John and William.

== Shooting ==
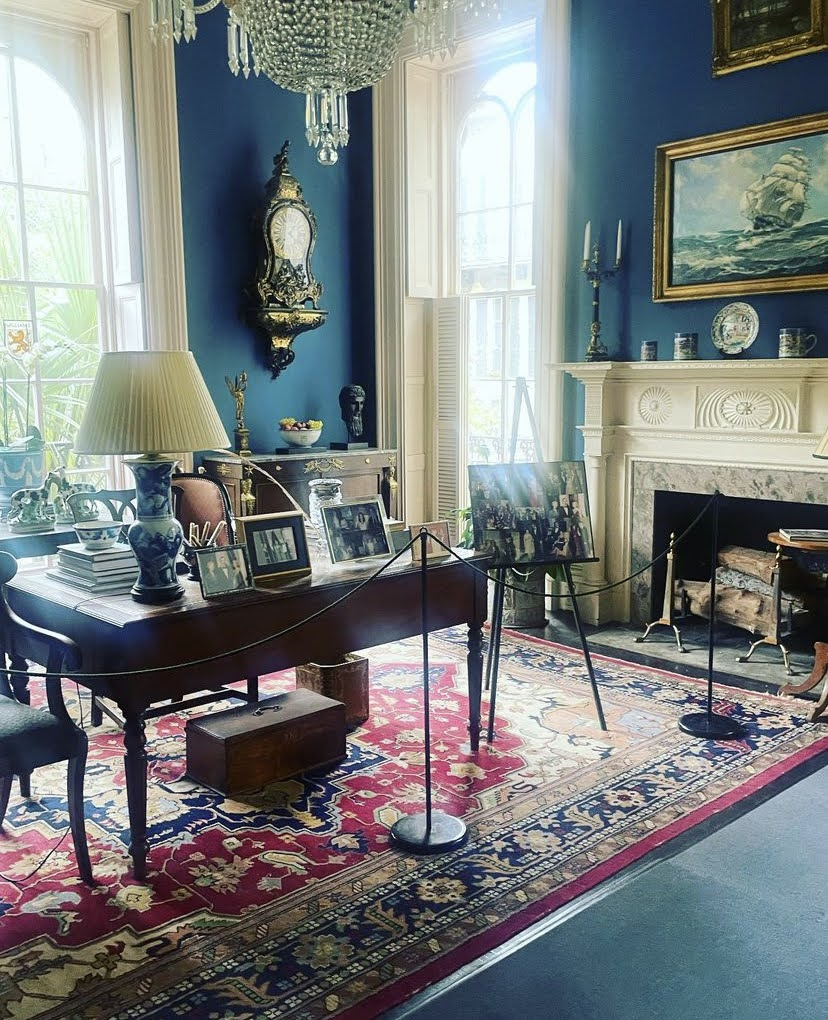
The Mercer House study, in which Hansford was killed

In the early hours of May 2, 1981, Hansford and Jim Williams had an argument at Williams's residence at Mercer House, in Monterey Square, Savannah. According to police statements made by Williams, Hansford had resided in the home for two years and was playing a video game when the argument ensued. During the argument, Hansford, of whom Williams had been a sexual partner for about two years, pushed over an 18th-century English grandfather clock which stood in the hallway. Williams was in his study at the time, and Hansford soon entered, whereupon he drew a gun on Williams. The gun jammed upon firing, however. Williams then pulled a 9mm Luger pistol from his desk and shot Hansford in the head, chest and back.

Williams called the police at 3:00 A.M. to report the shooting, just over half an hour after the incident occurred. Chatham County coroner Dr. James C. Metts attended the scene. Williams was taken into custody and charged with murder by Deppish Kirkland, Chatham County Chief Assistant District Attorney. Georgia Superior Court Judge Eugene H. Gadsden set Williams's bond at $25,000, which he posted. Williams claimed that he shot Hansford in self-defense. Prosecutors asserted that Williams had staged the crime scene to make it appear as if Hansford had actually fired a gun at him.

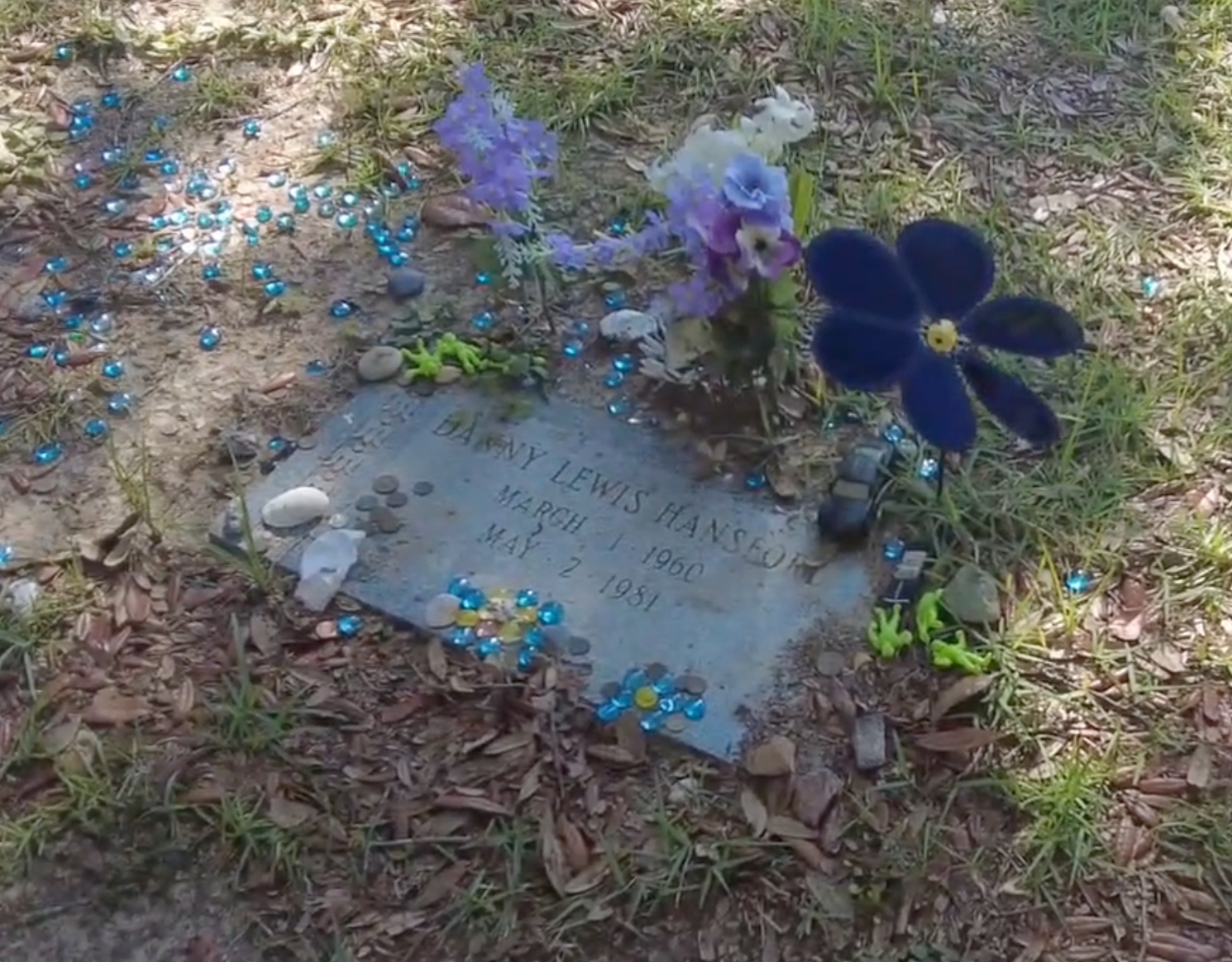
Hansford's grave at Greenwich Cemetery in Savannah

Hansford, 21, was buried in Savannah's Greenwich Cemetery.

=== Trials ===
Under "State of Georgia vs. James A. Williams", Williams was tried four times, a record for the state of Georgia. Bobby Lee Cook defended Williams during the first trial, in February 1982, presided over by Judge George Oliver. Williams was convicted and sentenced to life in prison. He appealed, posting the $25,000 bond. Cook later anonymously received a copy of the police report showing that the arresting officer had contradicted himself about a bullet hole in a floor in Mercer House. The verdict was overturned in January 1983 by the Georgia Supreme Court and a new trial was ordered. As Berendt wrote in his book: "The ruling appeared to be little more than a temporary reprieve. The hole in the floor had been unimportant in the trial; the main points of evidence in Spencer Lawton's case against Williams still remained intact."

Sonny Seiler assumed Williams's defense at the second trial, beginning in September 1983, and decided to have Williams openly bring up his sexuality. Little else differed from the first trial: on October 8, Williams was again found guilty and sentenced to life imprisonment. In June 1985, the Georgia Supreme Court overturned the conviction again, stating that the sheriff should not have been allowed to testify as an expert, and that the prosecutor waited until his closing argument to demonstrate some evidence.

The third trial, held in the spring of 1987, resulted in a mistrial. New evidence showed Hansford's hands were not bagged by the police at the crime scene, which meant that if there was gunpowder residue present on the victim's hands it could have been rubbed off during the subsequent movement of the body. During deliberations, a juror supposedly called a paramedic to ask some medical questions, though it could not be proven. After two deliberations, the jury still had not reached a verdict, with one woman adamantly insisting she saw reasonable doubt and would not alter her verdict. On June 9, 1987, with an 11–1 vote in favor of a "guilty" verdict, it was declared a hung jury.

The fourth and final trial, which was moved to Augusta, resulted in Williams's acquittal on May 12, 1989, eight years after his conviction. Overall, he had spent 22 months in prison over the eight years.

On January 14, 1990, after eight months of being a free man, a 59-year-old Williams collapsed and died at home. He is believed to have died in his study, the scene of the shooting, although Sonny Seiler stated that he found Williams on the threshold between the study and the hallway.

== Midnight in the Garden of Good and Evil ==
Hansford was renamed "Billy Hanson" in the 1997 Clint Eastwood-directed movie adaptation of the book, in which he was portrayed by Jude Law.
