= Savannah High School (Georgia) =

Public high school located in Savannah, Georgia, United States

Location
- 400 Pennsylvania Avenue; Savannah, Georgia 31404; United States; 32°03′47″N 81°03′28″W

Information
- Type: Public secondary
- School district: Savannah-Chatham County Public Schools
- CEEB code: 112710
- Principal: Gequetta Jenkins
- Teaching staff: 11.10 (FTE)
- Grades: 9–12
- Enrollment: 145 (2023-2024)
- Student to teacher ratio: 13.06
- Colors: Blue and white
- Nickname: Blue Jackets
- Accreditation: Southern Association of Colleges and Schools
- Website: spwww.sccpss.com/schools/shs/Pages/default.aspx

Savannah High School is a public high school located in Savannah, Georgia, United States.

== Campus ==
Savannah High is now located at 400 Pennsylvania Avenue.

== History ==
Savannah High School was originally located on Washington Avenue between East and West Atlantic Avenues. The original building, built by the WPA and designed by William Bordley Clarke Sr., was once the largest public school building in the United States. The foundation of the original building had been built as a luxury hotel, but the owners went bankrupt in the Great Depression and the City of Savannah took over the unfinished building. The three-story brick and mortar structure included two interior courtyards, one of which held a rifle range for the ROTC as well as several circular interior fire escape slides, which have since been sealed off. The distance around the interior hallway was in excess of one quarter mile. Today, that building houses the Savannah Arts Academy, the only public high school for the arts in Savannah.

== Academics ==
The Savannah High School campus hosts two separate programs of study:

- Liberal Studies at Savannah High School
- Law and Criminal Justice at Savannah High School

== Athletics ==
Savannah High School has competed in Region 3-AAA since 2016. The school is a member of the Georgia High School Association.

== Notable alumni ==
- Taz Anderson, former professional football player
- Donté Curry, former professional football player
- Pervis Ellison, former NBA basketball player
- Walter E. Gaskin, former U.S.M.C. Lt. General
- Leroy Harris, former professional football player
- Frank Kearse, former professional football player
- Dep Kirkland, former law enforcement officer
- Tomikia P. LeGrande, American academic administrator
- Casey Mitchell, basketball player for Elitzur Ashkelon of the Israeli Basketball Premier League
- Avon Riley, former professional football player
- Leah Ward Sears, former Chief Justice of the Georgia Supreme Court
- Jason Shiell, former professional baseball player
- Willie Smith, former professional baseball player for the St. Louis Cardinals
- Richard P. Stanley, Professor of Applied Mathematics at MIT
- Wylly Folk St. John, writer
