= George Anderson Gordon =

American politician

George Anderson Gordon (1830 – 1872) was an American politician.

Gordon was born in Savannah, Georgia, in September of 1830. He entered the Sophomore Class at Yale College in Sept., 1846, and after graduation in 1849 remained for a year, engaged in the study of law, in the Law Department. In November of 1850 he began the practice of his profession in Newark, New Jersey. In the following summer he returned to Savannah, where he continued in practice, in partnership with George Anderson Mercer, until the close of the year 1860. During this period he was, successively, U.S. District Attorney for Georgia and Member of the Georgia House of Representatives. In 1860-61 he was a member of the Georgia State Senate, and then entered the Confederate military service, as captain in the 1st Regiment of Georgia Volunteers. He subsequently became major and colonel. After the close of the war, he removed to Huntsville, Alabama, where he engaged in the practice of the law until his last illness. He died in Huntsville, age 42.

He married Carolina B. Steenbergen, of Virginia, June 5, 1850. She died July 16, 1851, leaving one son. He later married Ellen C. Bevine on January 12, 1854. She died August 15, 1867, leaving six children, one of whom, Percy Gordon, was the father of diplomat George A. Gordon.

This article incorporates public domain material from the Yale Obituary Record.
