= Greenwich Cemetery (Savannah, Georgia) =

- Interactive map of Greenwich Cemetery

Details
- Established: 1933
- Location: 330 Bonaventure Road; Savannah, Georgia, United States
- Coordinates: 32°3′5″N 81°2′22″W
- Type: Public municipal
- Owned by: City of Savannah
- Size: 65-acre (263,000 m^{2})
- Website: Greenwich Cemetery
- Find a Grave: Greenwich Cemetery

Greenwich Cemetery is a rural cemetery located on a bluff of the Wilmington River, east of Savannah, Georgia. It stands on the site of the former Greenwich Plantation and became an addition to Bonaventure Cemetery (itself on the former grounds of Bonaventure Plantation) in 1933. It is the newest of the city's four municipal cemeteries.

The entrance to the cemetery, located at 330 Bonaventure Road, is shared with Bonaventure Cemetery. Immediately inside the gates is the large and ornate Gaston Tomb of William Gaston.

== History ==
In 1896, long after Greenwich Plantation was demolished, naval stores magnate Spencer P. Shotter purchased the land and built a Beaux-Arts mansion and extensive gardens. The house and grounds were used in several silent films (including Stolen Moments) before the house burned to the ground in 1923. The City of Savannah purchased the land in 1933. With it came fourteen of Shotter's statues, which the city placed into storage. They remained stored until 1965, at which point they were loaned to Savannah's Telfair Museums. In 2020, the city approved the sale of sixteen of the statues, with a collective price tag of $400,000. One item was kept because it was part of a set of two, the other part being on display at Telfair.

== Greenwich Park ==
A 3.5-acre section of the cemetery has been made into a passive park or meditation area for visitors.

== Notable burials ==
- Danny Hansford (1960–1981)
- Cecelia Seiler (1933–2014), wife of Sonny Seiler and co-owner of Uga
