= Hood mould =

Element of architecture

In architecture, a hood mould, hood, label mould (from Latin labia, lip), drip mould or dripstone is an external moulded projection from a wall over an opening to throw off rainwater, historically often in form of a pediment. This moulding can be terminated at the side by ornamentation called a label stop.

The hood mould was introduced into architecture in the Romanesque period, though they became much more common in the Gothic period. Later, with the increase in rectangular windows they became more prevalent in domestic architecture.

== Styles of hood moulding ==
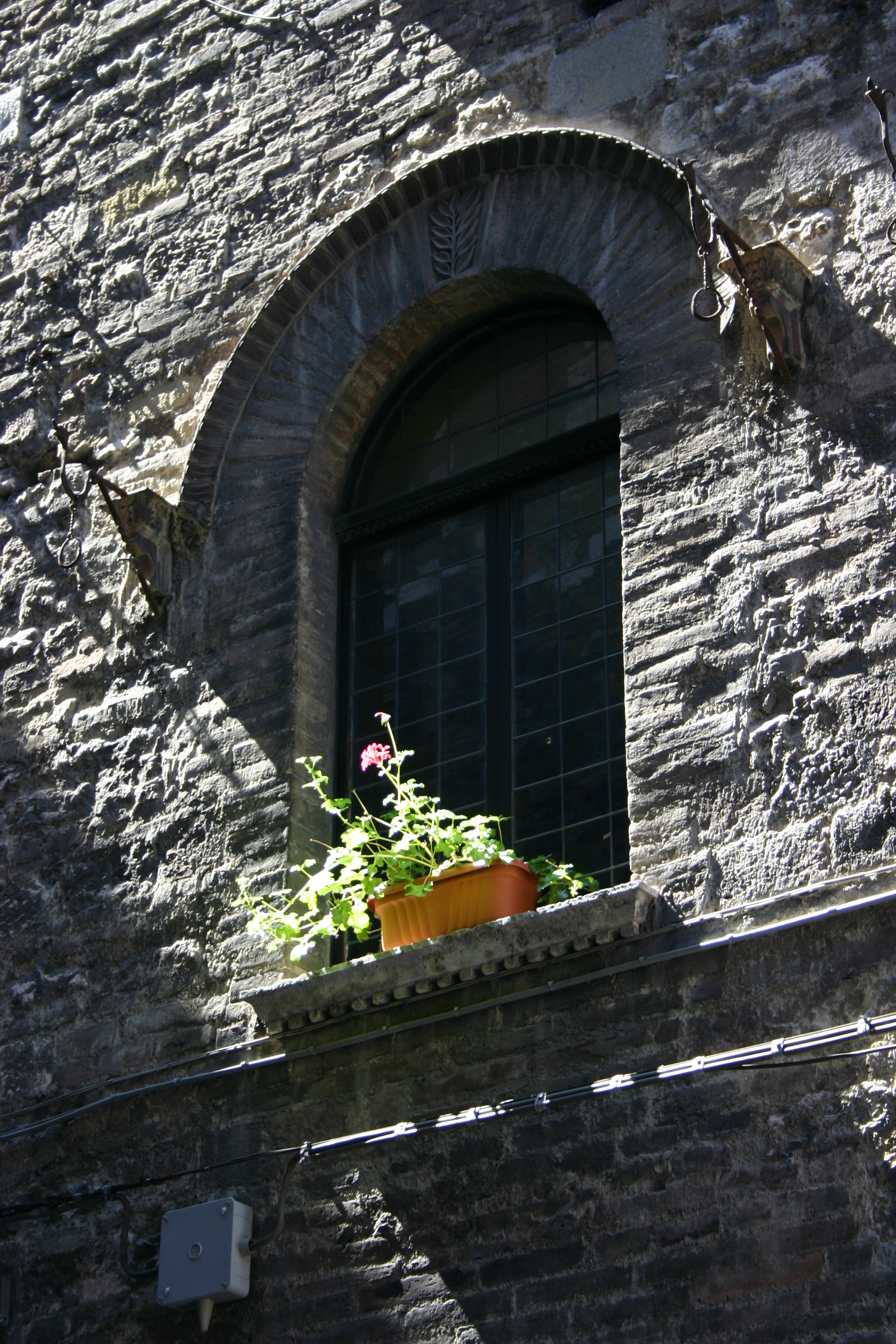
Circular hood moulding (in Perugia, Italy).

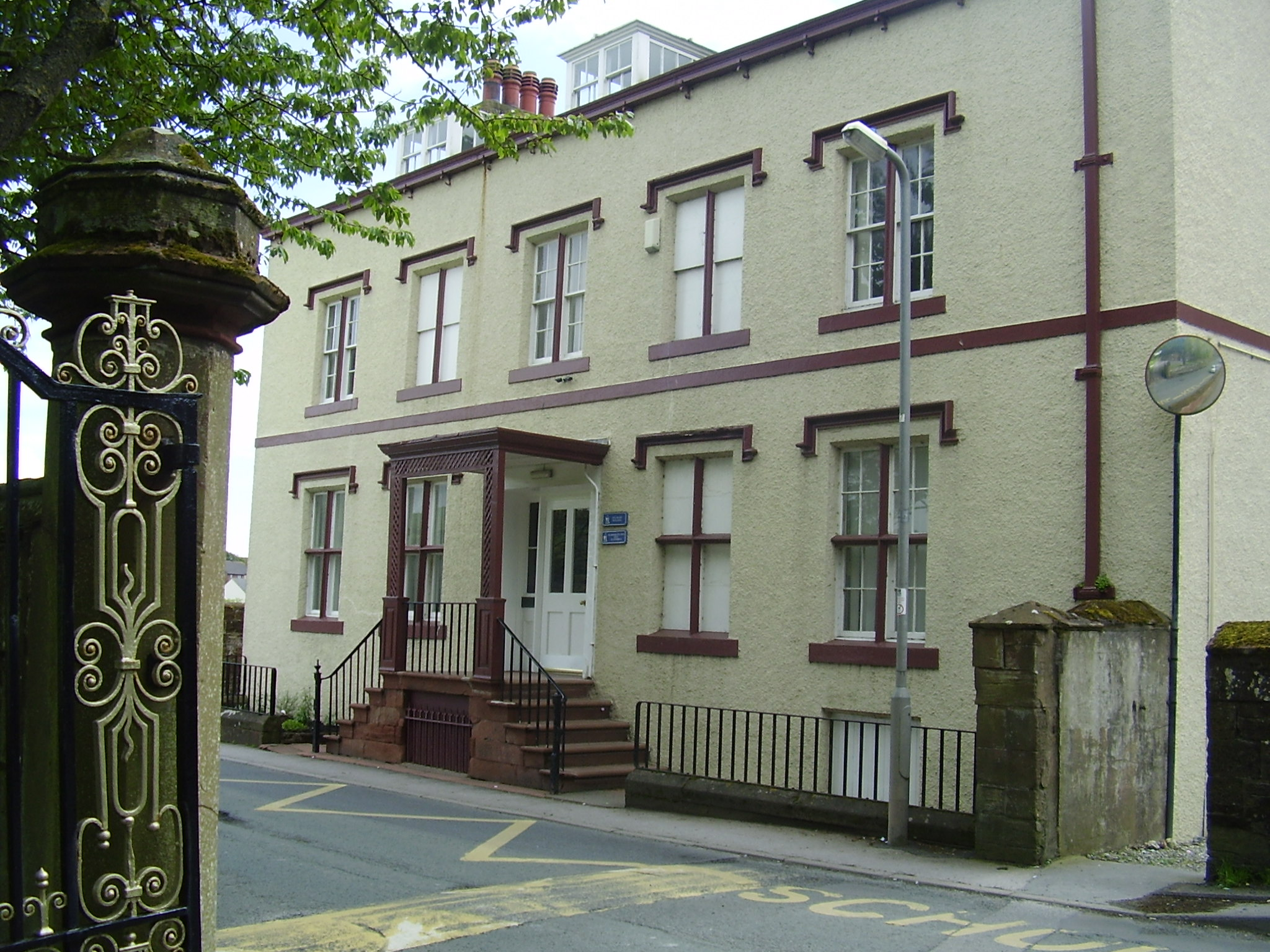
Rectangular hood mouldings on a rendered Victorian building (in Cumbria, England).

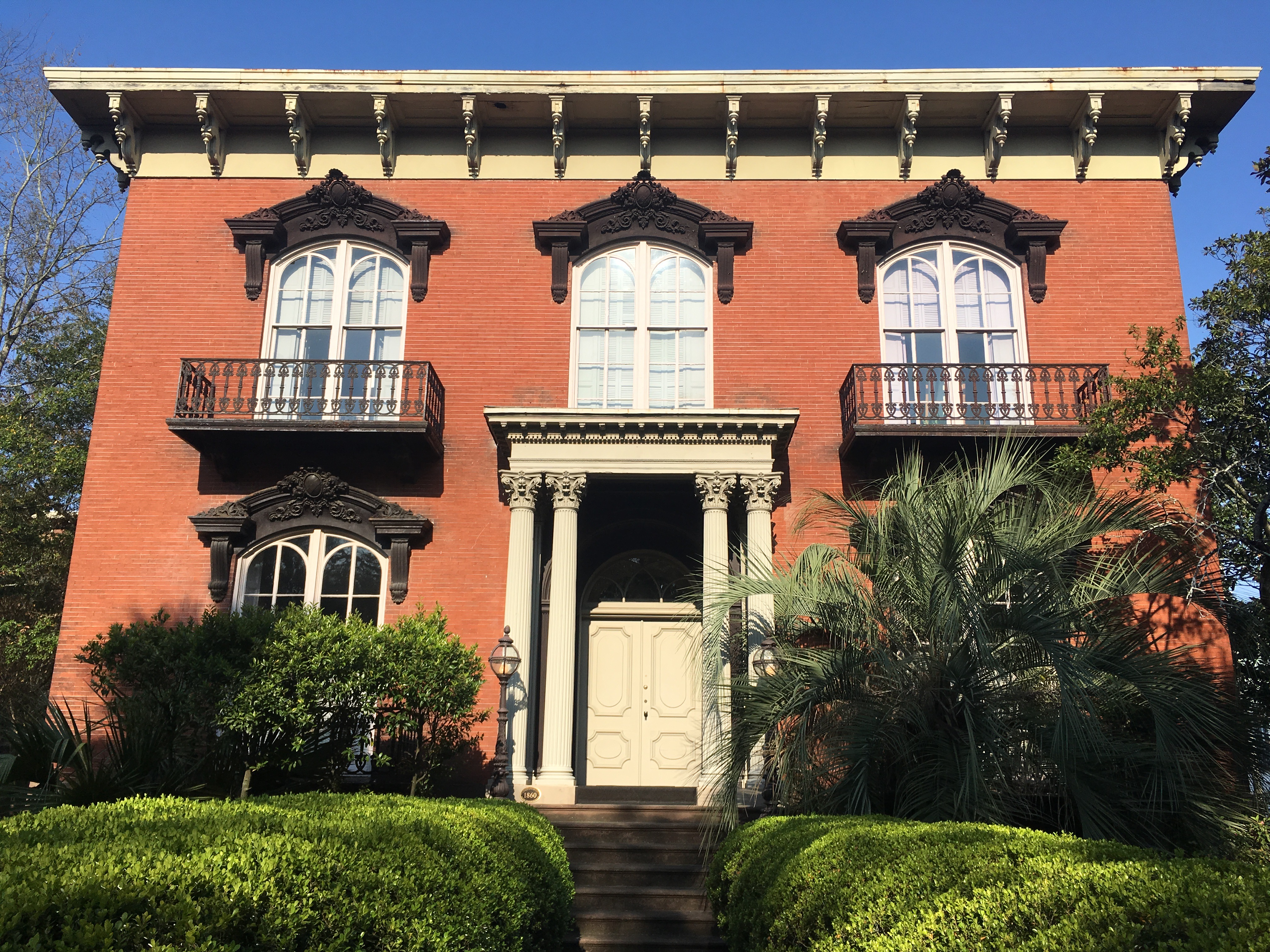
Every window of the Mercer House (in Savannah, Georgia, U.S.) is crowned with a cast-iron hood moulding.

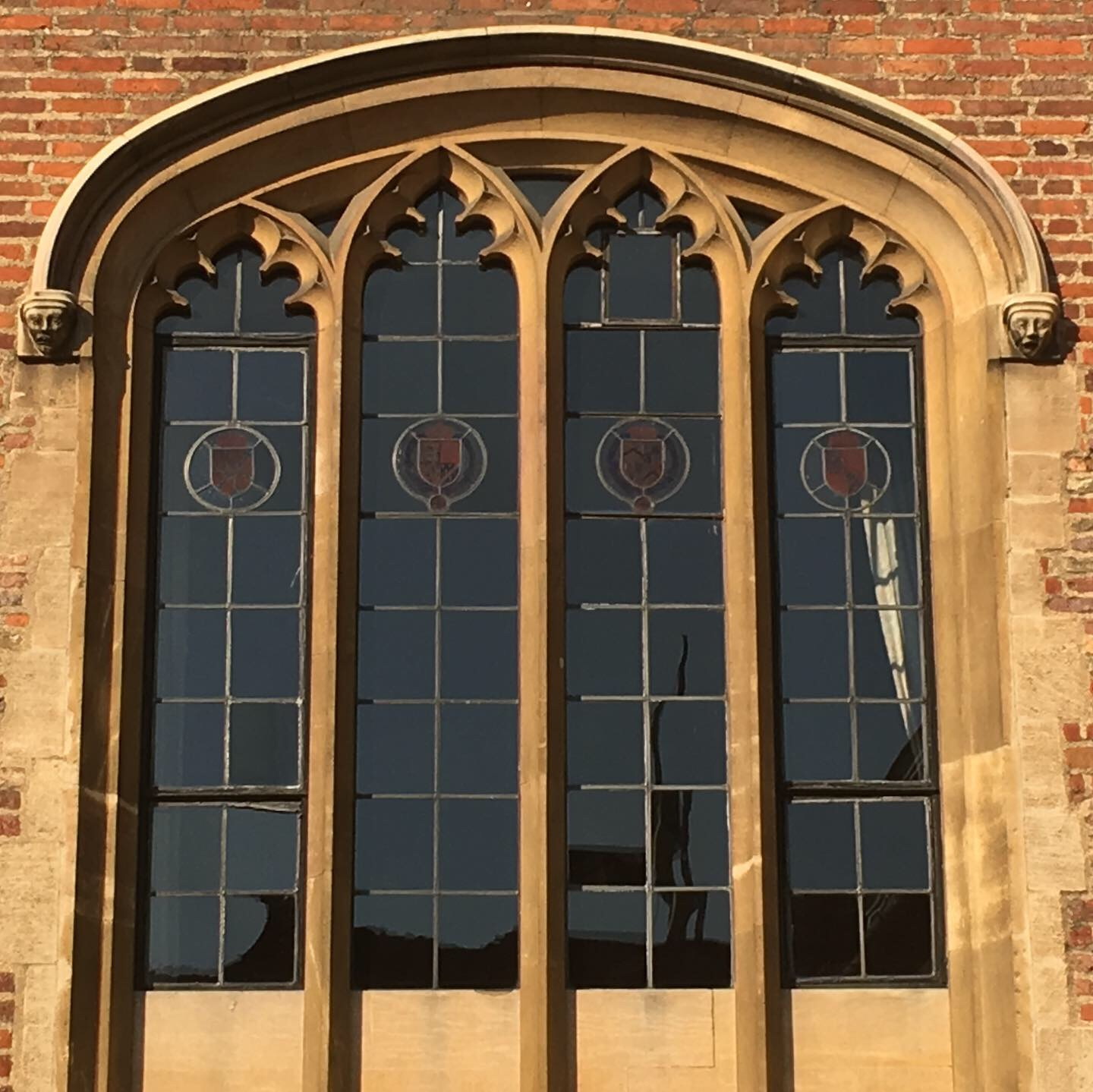
Tudor-style hood mould ending in decorative label stops (Magdalene College, University of Cambridge, England).
