= George Anderson Mercer =

American politician

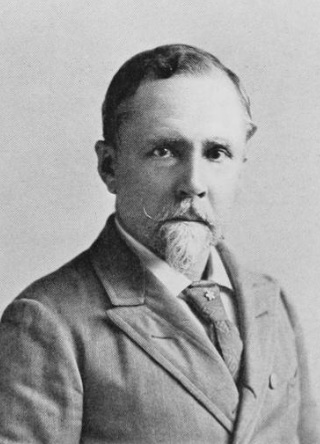
- Mercer in 1900.

Personal details
- Born: February 9, 1835 Savannah, Georgia, U.S.
- Died: October 23, 1907 (aged 72) Savannah, Georgia, U.S.
- Resting place: Bonaventure Cemetery
- Spouse: Ann Maury Herndon (–1885; her death)
- Children: 7
- Parent: Hugh W. Mercer (father)
- Education: Princeton College; University of Virginia
- Occupation: Military officer, politician

George Anderson Mercer (February 9, 1835 – October 23, 1907) was an American lawyer and Confederate lieutenant in the American Civil War. One of the "most honored and distinguished citizens" of Savannah, Georgia, he served in the Georgia legislature between 1872 and 1874, and was United States district judge for the southern district of Georgia.

== Early life ==
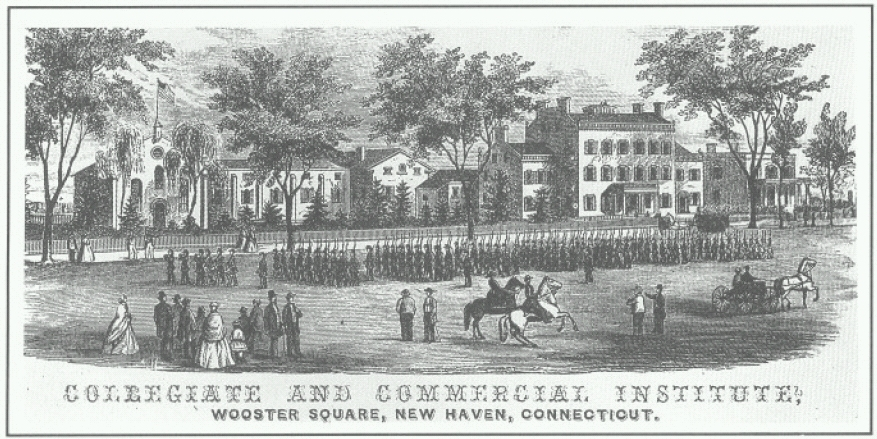
New Haven Collegiate and Commercial Institute in 1860

Mercer was born in 1835 in Savannah, Georgia, to General Hugh Weedon Mercer and Mary Stites Anderson. He was their eldest child of three, followed by Mary, Robert and Georgia. Georgia died in 1878, aged 27, while living in Brookline, Massachusetts. Robert was secretary of Savannah's exclusive Oglethorpe Club between 1878 and 1898. Mercer's paternal great-grandfather was General Hugh Mercer. His maternal grandfather, George Anderson, was a prominent citizen and wealthy cotton merchant in Savannah.

He summered with his mother in Newport, Rhode Island, where George Noble Jones, a fellow Savannahian, had a cottage built in 1839.

After receiving basic education in the Savannah schools, Mercer was sent to the Russell Military Academy in New Haven, Connecticut, before returning to the city of his birth to study under William T. Feay. He entered the 1853 sophomore class of Princeton College and graduated in 1856 with a degree in Master of Arts. He attended the law school of the University of Virginia in 1857–58 before traveling around Europe.

== Career ==
Upon returning from Europe in the late 1850s, Mercer entered the Savannah law office of Loyd & Owens, and was admitted to the bar in January 1859. He spent a year with the firm of Ward, Jackson & Jones, before entering a partnership with George A. Gordon, who was then general counsel of the Central of Georgia Railway.

At the outbreak of the American Civil War in 1861, Mercer entered service for the Confederates as a corporal in the Republican Blues of Savannah. In November, he was appointed captain in the department of the adjudant general, also being given the title of assistant adjudant general. He was later moved to the Western Army, initially under the charge of General Walker but, after the division was broken up, he became adjudant of Smith's brigade in the division under the command of General Patrick Cleburne.

Toward the conclusion of the war, Mercer was sent to report to General Howell Cobb in Macon, Georgia. On April 20, 1865, he was captured by forces under the command of Major-General James H. Wilson in what became known as Wilson's Raid. He was soon paroled, however, and returned to Savannah, where he resumed his legal practice.

Between 1872 and 1874, he represented Chatham County in the Georgia General Assembly. He declined the offer extended by U.S. President Chester A. Arthur, a close friend, of becoming the federal judge for Georgia.

He became captain of the Republican Blues, a role in which he remained for fifteen years, and colonel of the 1st Georgia Volunteers.

== Personal life ==
Mercer married Ann Maury Herndon, known as "Nannie", with whom he had seven children: Hugh, George, Nannie, Robert, Lee, Edward and Herndon. Hugh died in 1870, aged six, and Herndon died in 1878, aged two. George became father to Johnny Mercer, the noted Savannah songwriter, two years after his own father's death.

He spent summers with his family at White Bluff, a resort community south of Savannah, on the banks of the Vernon River. In Savannah, the family lived on Whitaker Street.

He was a member of the Georgia Historical Society, soon becoming its vice-president and, upon the death of John Screven in 1900, president. He remained in the role for seven years, resigning shortly before his death.

== Death ==
Mercer died in the care of Dr. Thomas Jackson Charlton in hospital in Savannah in 1907. Aged 72, having been living with a "nervous malady" for twelve years and, in 1906, suffering a stroke which left him unable to walk. He was interred in Savannah's Bonaventure Cemetery, alongside his wife, who predeceased him by 22 years, aged 43. After her death, he moved his sons to Bonaventure from Laurel Grove Cemetery.
