= Laurent Dey =

French clockmaker

- Died: 1774
- Occupation: Clockmaker

Laurent Dey (died 1774) was a French clockmaker. He was a master of the Paris Clockmakers' Guild in 1744.

== Career ==
Dey established a workshop on Rue de la Cerisaie, Paris, in 1733. Eleven years later, he was listed as a master of the Paris Clockmakers' Guild.

He moved, by 1748, to Rue Saint Antoine. The workshops used cases by François Goyer, Balthazar Lieutaud, N. J. Marchand, Antoine Foullet and Jean-Joseph de Saint-Germain.

He was in business with his son, Nicolas Laurent, in 1765. After Dey's death in 1774, his son continued the business.

A Louis XV ormolu-mounted Boulle marquetry bracket clock with conforming bracket hung on the wall of the study was in the possession of American preservationist James Arthur Williams, who had it on display in his Mercer House study in Savannah, Georgia.
