= Casey Mitchell (basketball) =

American basketball player (born 1988)

Personal information
- Born: January 16, 1988 (age 38) Savannah, Georgia, U.S.
- Listed height: 6 ft 4 in (1.93 m)
- Listed weight: 220 lb (100 kg)

Career information
- High school: Savannah (Savannah, Georgia)
- College: Chipola (2007–2009); West Virginia (2009–2011)
- NBA draft: 2011: undrafted
- Playing career: 2011–2014
- Position: Shooting guard

Career history
- 2011–2012: Sioux Falls Skyforce
- 2012: Union Olimpija
- 2012: Phantoms Braunschweig
- 2013: Sioux Falls Skyforce
- 2013–2014: Elitzur Ashkelon

Brian Casey Mitchell (born January 16, 1988) is an American professional basketball player who last played for Elitzur Ashkelon of the Israeli Basketball Premier League. He attended Savannah High School and played college basketball for Chipola College and West Virginia University.

== Professional career ==
Mitchell went undrafted in the 2011 NBA draft. On August 13, 2011, he signed with Rethymno Aegean of Greece for the 2011–12 season. He later left in October 2011 before appearing in a game for them. On November 3, 2011, he was selected by the Sioux Falls Skyforce in the third round of the 2011 NBA D-League draft.

On December 10, 2011, Mitchell signed with the Houston Rockets. However, he was waived by the Rockets three days later. He then re-joined Sioux Falls on December 15. On February 2, 2012, he terminated his contract with Sioux Falls. On February 13, 2012, he signed with Union Olimpija of Slovenia for the rest of the 2011–12 season.

On July 26, 2012, Mitchell signed with Phantoms Braunschweig of Germany for the 2012–13 season. On December 30, 2012, he parted ways with Braunschweig after 11 games. On March 5, 2013, he was reacquired by the Sioux Falls Skyforce.

On October 9, 2013, Mitchell signed with Elitzur Ashkelon of Israel for the 2013–14 season.

On November 3, 2014, Mitchell was reacquired by the Sioux Falls Skyforce. However, he was waived by the Skyforce four days later.
