= Hugh W. Mercer =

Confederate General in the American Civil War

Hugh Weedon Mercer
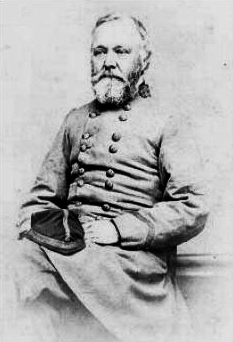
- Born: November 27, 1808; Fredericksburg, Virginia
- Died: June 9, 1877 (aged 68); Baden-Baden, Germany
- Burial place: Bonaventure Cemetery, Savannah, Georgia
- Children: George Anderson Mercer
- Military career
- Allegiance: United States of America; Confederate States of America
- Branch: United States Army; Confederate States Army
- Service years: 1828–1835 (USA); 1861–1865 (CSA)
- Rank: First Lieutenant (USA); First Lieutenant (Georgia Militia); Brigadier General (CSA)
- Unit: 2nd U.S. Artillery
- Commands: 10th Georgia Infantry Battalion; 1st Georgia Infantry Regiment; District of Georgia; Mercer's Brigade
- Conflicts: American Civil War; Battle of Kennesaw Mountain; Battle of Atlanta

Hugh Weedon Mercer (November 27, 1808 – June 9, 1877) was an officer in the United States Army and then a Confederate general during the American Civil War.

== Early life ==
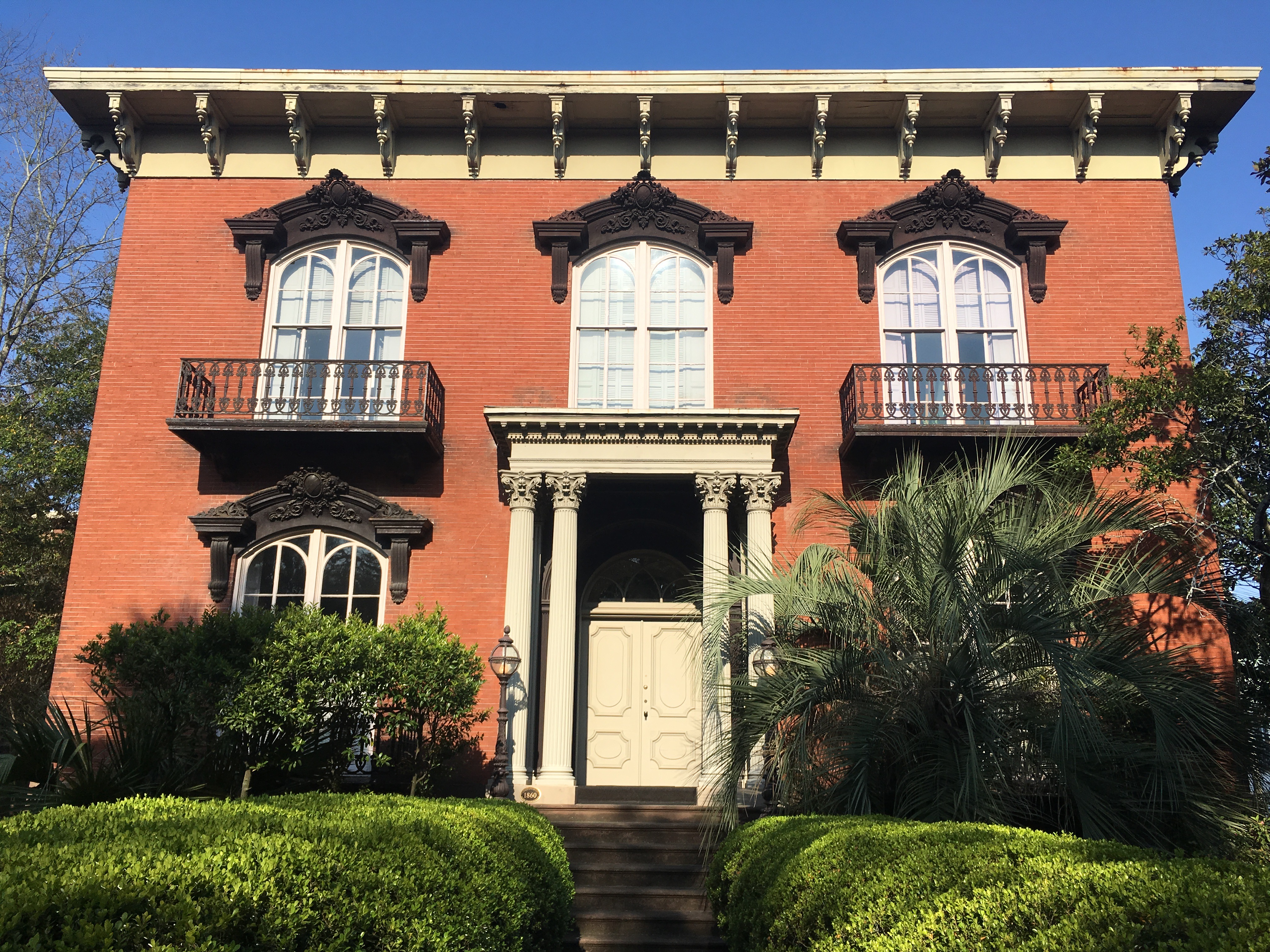
The historic Mercer House. The construction of the home was interrupted by the Civil War and Mr. Mercer never lived in it.

Hugh W. Mercer, the son of Hugh Tenant Weedon Mercer and his wife Louisa Griffin (daughter of Cyrus Griffin), was born in Fredericksburg, Virginia, to a wealthy and well-known family. His grandfather and namesake Hugh Mercer of Scotland had been a general under George Washington during the American Revolution. Mercer attended West Point in 1824. He was expelled for participating in the Eggnog Riot in 1826. But following a pardon by President John Quincy Adams, Mercer was permitted to graduate in 1828 (3rd out of 33).

Mercer was commissioned as a second lieutenant in the US Artillery. He spent much of his time serving in Georgia, including service at Cantonment Oglethorpe near Savannah from 1828 to 1835, and was an aide to Major General Winfield Scott. Mercer was promoted to first lieutenant of artillery in October 1834.

In April 1835, he resigned his commission and settled in Savannah, where he married a local woman, Mary Stites Anderson, a daughter of George Wayne Anderson, president of The Planters' Bank for forty years. One of their children was George Anderson Mercer, who became a noted military officer and lawyer. Hugh's brother-in-law was George Wayne Anderson. While Mercer worked as a bank cashier at The Planters Bank, he served as an artillery officer in the Georgia Militia. He started building the Italianate-style Mercer House on the western side of Monterey Square in Savannah. However, the Civil War interrupted its construction and no Mercer ever lived there.

== Civil War ==
On May 27, 1861, he enlisted in the Confederate army, and was commissioned as the colonel of the 1st Georgia Infantry. He was promoted to brigadier general by the end of October. He served as commander of the District of Georgia. In August 1862, he played a major role in impressing the first group of slaves and free blacks into service for the Confederacy. By November, however, he lost his authority to impress workers, and depended on Governor Joseph E. Brown and local sheriffs to provide slaves to join the Confederate effort. At the beginning of the Atlanta campaign, he left Savannah and took command of a brigade in the Army of Tennessee.

Mercer fought at Dalton, Marietta and Kennesaw Mountain (where his son was wounded). Following the Battle of Atlanta in 1864, he became ill and was relieved of command. He was sent home to Savannah, where he served under Lieutenant General William J. Hardee. Mercer was considered to be a good officer, but was unable to endure the physical demands of active duty.

Mercer commanded the 10th Battalion, Georgia Infantry, which was charged with the defense of the Savannah area. When Hardee retreated in December 1864, Mercer left the city, returning after the fighting ended. He was briefly imprisoned on at Fort Pulaski, which he had once commanded, on Cockspur Island after the end of the war, along with other prominent Confederate leaders.

== Later life ==
After the war, Mercer returned to Savannah and resumed his work in banking. He was arrested and tried by a military court for the murders of 7 Union prisoners of war, but was acquitted in February 1866. In 1869, he moved to Baltimore, where he worked as a commission merchant. However, with failing health, Mercer traveled to the spa resort in Baden-Baden, Germany for treatment in 1872.

He died there in 1877. Mercer's body was returned to Savannah. He was buried in Bonaventure Cemetery, owned by City of Savannah, located in Thunderbolt, Georgia.

His great-grandson Johnny Mercer (1909–1976) was a lyricist and composer who co-founded Capitol Records.

His great x5 grandson Sergeant Christopher Mercer Lowe (US Army) served in the same Georgia National Guard unit (HHB 1/118th FA Chatham Artillery, 48th IBCT) almost 150 years after him and his son, Lt George A. Mercer.

== See also ==
- List of American Civil War generals (Confederate)
