= Mercer House (Savannah, Georgia) =

Historic house in Savannah, Georgia, US, built in the 1860s

Mercer Williams House Museum
- Mercer House
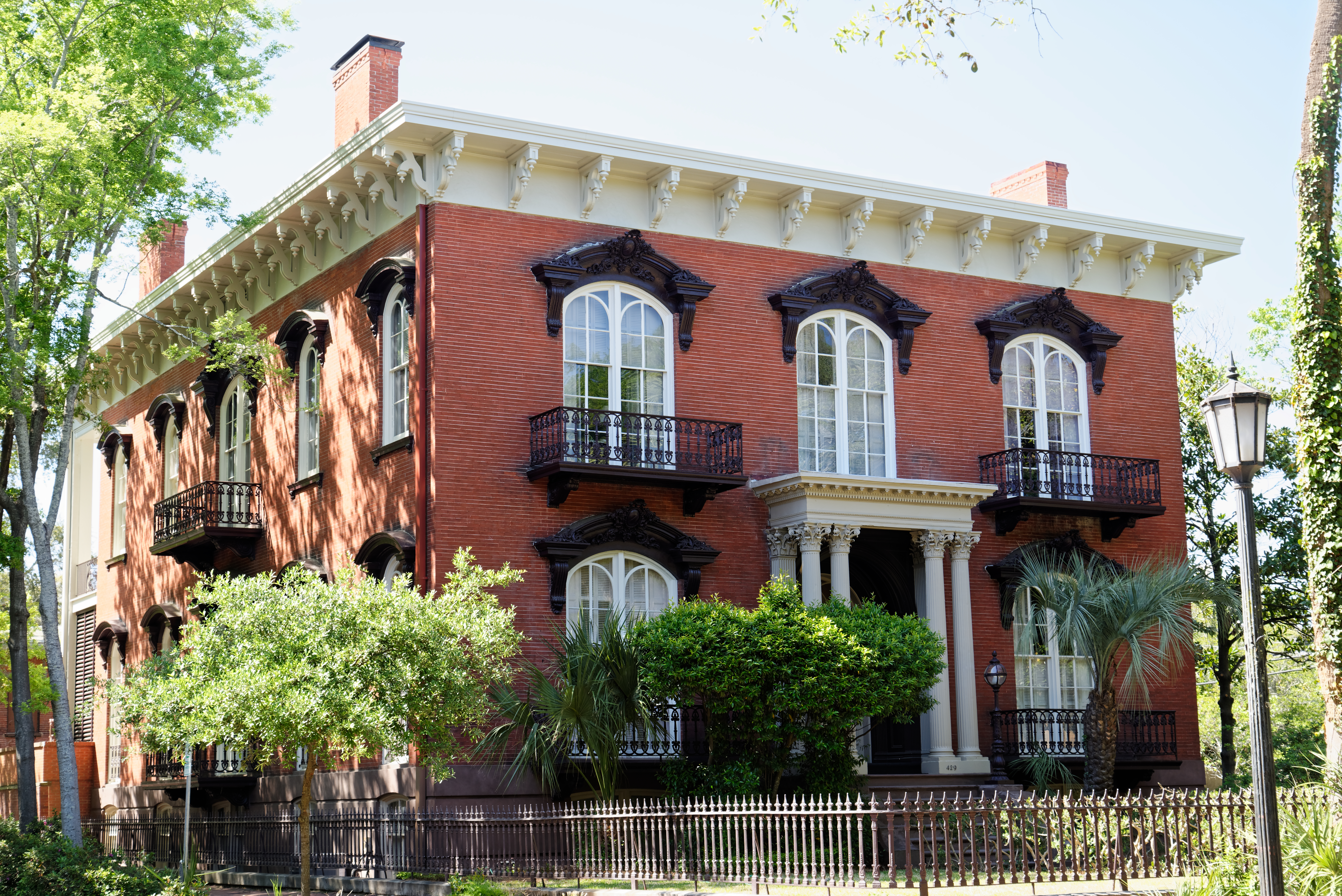
- The house in 2020
- Interactive map of the Mercer Williams House Museum area
- Former names: Mercer House

General information
- Architectural style: Italianate
- Location: Savannah, Georgia, U.S., 429 Bull Street, Monterey Square
- Coordinates: 32°04′17″N 81°05′44″W
- Construction started: 1860
- Completed: 1868 (158 years ago)
- Owner: 1860 – 1868 Hugh W. Mercer; 1868 – 1879 John R. Wilder; Unknown – 1959 Savannah Shriners; 1969 – 1990 Jim Williams; 1990 – 2023 Dorothy Williams Kingery

Technical details
- Floor count: 3 (including basement)
- Floor area: 7,000 sq.ft.

Design and construction
- Architects: John S. Norris (further drawings by Muller and Bruyn)

Mercer House (now the Mercer Williams House Museum) is an Italianate mansion at 429 Bull Street in Savannah, Georgia, United States. Completed in 1868, it occupies the southwestern civic block of Monterey Square in the city's Historic District.

The house was the scene of the 1981 killing of Danny Hansford by the home's owner Jim Williams, a story that is retold in the 1994 John Berendt book Midnight in the Garden of Good and Evil. The house is also featured in the movie adaptation of the book, released three years later. Williams held annual Christmas parties at Mercer House, on the eve of the Savannah Cotillion Club's debutante ball, which were the highlight of many people's social calendars. Williams had an "in" box and an "out" box for his invitations, depending on whether or not the person was in Williams's favor at the time.

After Williams's death in 1990, the house was owned by Dorothy Williams Kingery, Williams's sister. She died in 2023.

The home is open, in restricted form, to the public for tours. Kingery's daughter and Williams's niece, Dorothy Susan Kingery, manages the museum, which is based out of the carriage house at the rear of the property.

== History ==
Designed in the Italianate style by John S. Norris for General Hugh Mercer (great-grandfather of the songwriter Johnny Mercer), construction of the house began in 1860. The project was interrupted by the American Civil War, and finally completed around 1868 by the new owner, cotton merchant John Randolph Wilder. Nobody of the Mercer name ever lived in the house.

In 1969, 11-year-old Tommy Downs fell from the roof of the house and was killed after being impaled on the iron fence on the West Gordon Street (southern) side of the house. It is believed he was hunting pigeons. The tip of one of the two spiked prongs he landed on, which broke during the incident, has since been replaced.

For a period in the twentieth century, the building was used as the Savannah Shriners Alee Temple. It then lay vacant for a decade, until 1969, when Jim Williams, one of Savannah's earliest and most dedicated private restorationists, bought the house for $55,000 and fully restored it over two years.

In 1979, during the filming on Monterey Square of The Ordeal of Dr. Mudd, starring Dennis Weaver, Williams hung a flag of Nazi Germany outside of a window at Mercer House in an attempt to disrupt the shoot, after the film company declined to make a donation to the local humane society, of which Williams was on the board, as he had requested. The Congregation Mickve Israel, located across the square, complained to the city.

Jackie Onassis, the widow of former U.S. President John F. Kennedy, visited Mercer House with her friend Maurice Tempelsman in the early 1980s. They had been traveling down the east coast on Tempelsman's yacht. Onassis offered $90,000 for a jade box made by the House of Fabergé. Even though it would have been a $20,000 profit, Williams having recently bought it at a Christie's auction in Europe, he turned it down.

To the surprise of Sonny Seiler, the Williams family attorney, Clint Eastwood convinced Dorothy Kingery (Williams's sister) to allow filming inside Mercer House for the movie adaptation of Midnight in the Garden of Good and Evil (1997). "Damn if she didn't do it," explained Seiler. "Clint is a charmer. I'll tell you what: he has no problem with the ladies or anybody else. But she had one deal: that they could not film any of the "unpleasantness," as she calls it, there. So they did all of that out at Warner Bros. But she let them film the house, the parties in there, and they were very pleased with it and so was she."

Jim Williams died in 1990, and his sister put the house up for sale later that decade with a price tag of just under $9,000,000. This was later reduced to about $7,000,000.

New Standard Enterprises undertook a complete exterior renovation of the house in December 2019.

Dorothy Kingery died in 2023, aged 88.

== Exterior ==
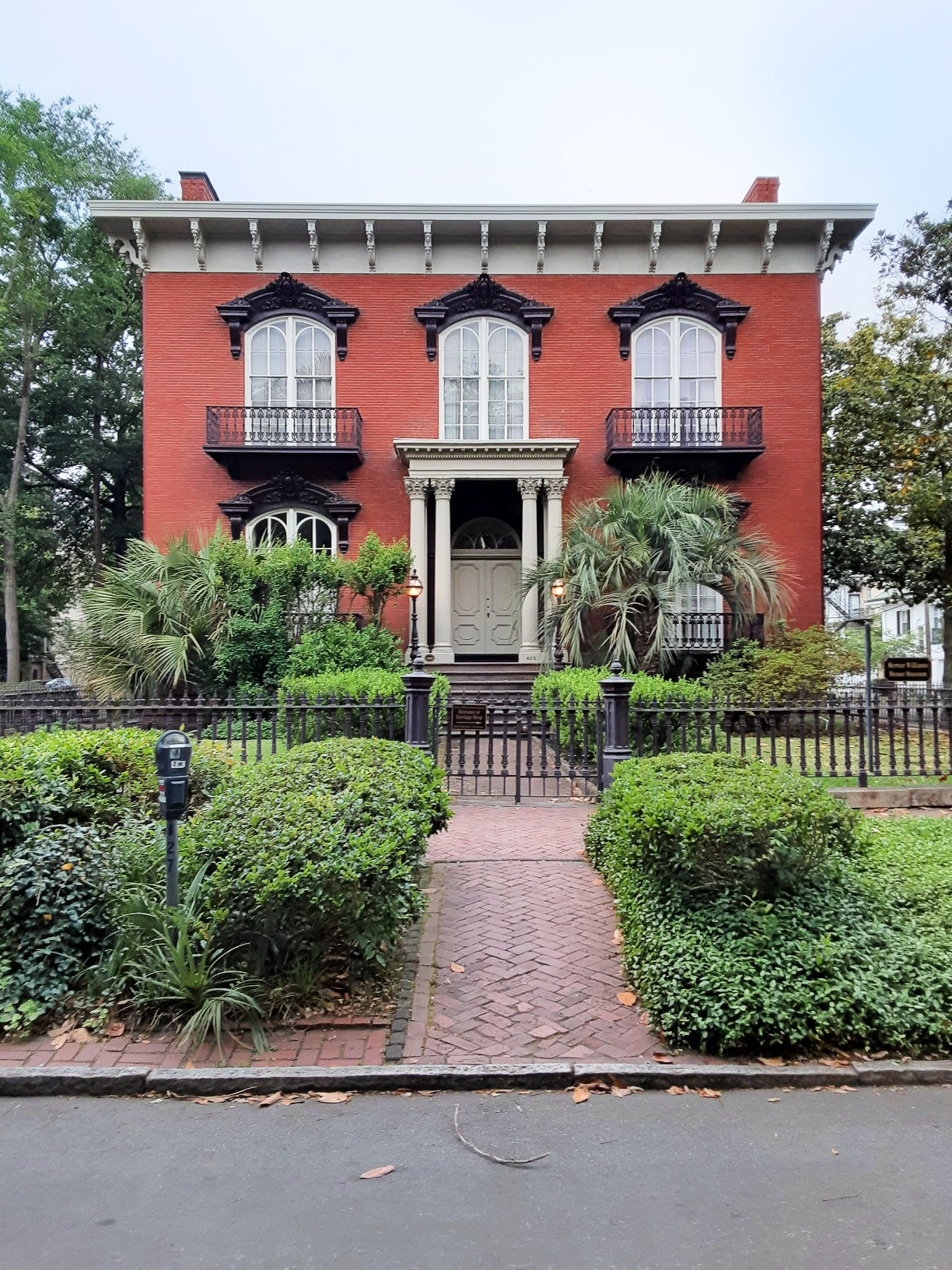
The house in 2022, viewed from Bull Street

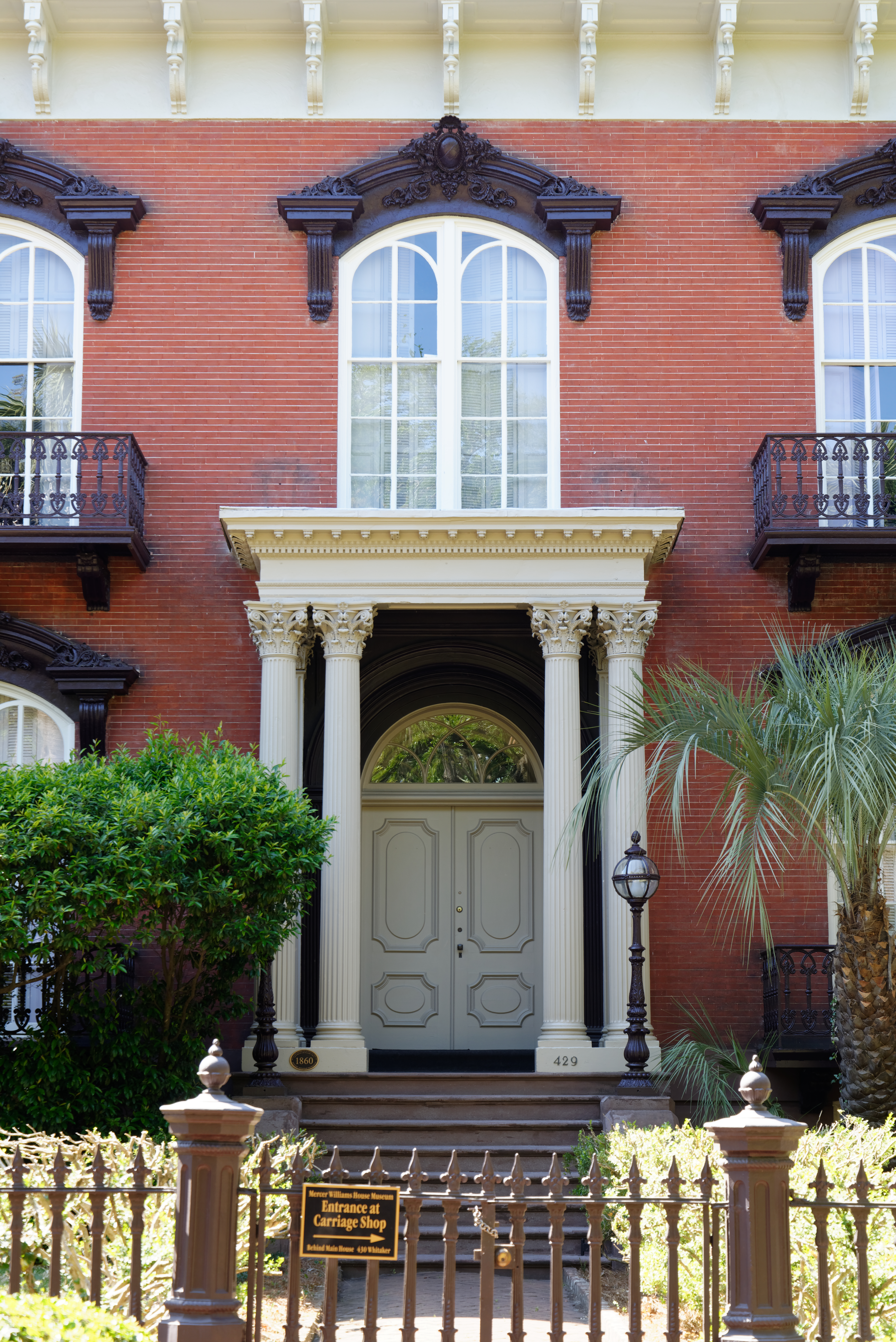
Doorway detail.

The property, constructed with "Philadelphia Red" bricks, is three stories, including a basement, where Williams's restoration workshop was. He and three employees repaired antiques, as well as doing gold leafing, veneering and marbleizing. The lot consists of a front yard, the house, a courtyard and a carriage house. It takes up a city trust lot — the only building in Savannah in private ownership to do so. An iron railing surrounds the northern, eastern and southern sides of the house, with a brick privacy wall continuing either side between the courtyard and the carriage house. The wall has since been increased in height.

The main façade, facing east onto Monterey Square, has five French windows (two on the first floor, three on the second). Except for the window above the double front doors, each French window on the three open sides of the house has a balcony surrounded by an iron railing. Each window on the first and second levels of these three open sides is crowned with a sculptural hood mold of cast iron. A classical portico, supported by two columns at each of the front corners, covers the front doors. Both sets of columns are adjoined at their bases (the base on the left is adorned with a plaque denoting the year construction on the house was begun; the right, the home's number).

Both the northern and southern (long) sides have a French window in the middle of both the first and second floors, flanked by two single windows on each side. The windows of the basement level mirror the size of the window immediately above.

At the rear, both the first and second levels open out onto verandas. The first floor has a double door with a French window on each side; the second floor has three windows and one door in the middle. The section without a window is where the ballroom organ is installed.

In total, there are 40 windows (including the basement level) and eight iron balconies.

Another notable feature of the home's exterior are the support brackets all around the soffit in the eaves of the roof.

In 1997, Dorothy Kingery established a trademark for the home's façade, and her lawyer dispatched letters to local artists demanding that they either stop using photographs of it for their own gain, or give her 10% of their proceeds.

== Interior ==
Many of Jim Williams's antiques and furnishings were sold by his sister at a Sotheby's auction on October 20, 2000. Where their locations in the house were known, they are mentioned in the relevant section below. As John Berendt wrote in Midnight in the Garden of Good and Evil: "If Mercer House was not quite the biggest private house in Savannah, it was certainly the most grandly furnished."

=== First floor ===
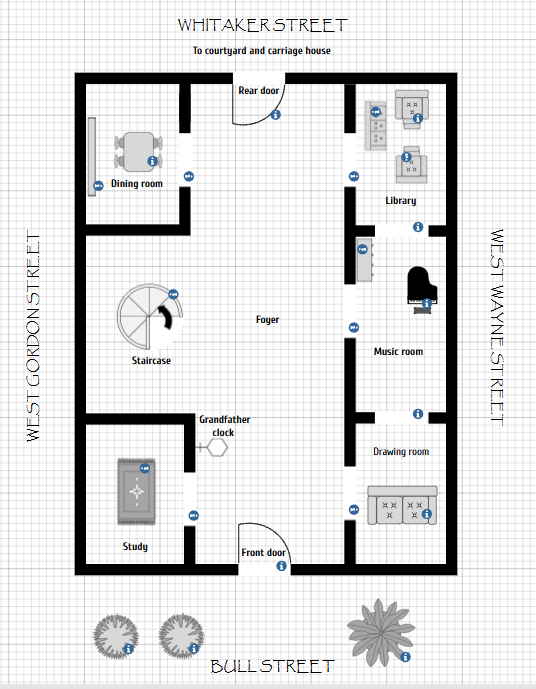
Plan of the first floor

Looking at the front of the house, at the bottom right is the drawing room, with a fireplace on the side of the house flanking West Wayne Street to the north. A George I Chinoiserie Japanned cabinet dating from around 1720, on a later George I-style stand, was located in this room. On top of this were three Chinese sang-de-bœuf glazed porcelain vases from the 19th century. Also in the drawing room, Williams kept an "assortment of curiosities", including Fabergé items, such as its jeweled eggs. His first purchase, made in London in 1971, was a large silver-gilt and enamel-mounted leather box, or presentation casket, bearing the Imperial coat-of-arms and the gold-crowned cypher of Tsar Nicholas II. It is dated 1899 and is estimated at $10,000. It was given by the Tsar to the Shah of Persia to commemorate the settlement of a long-standing border dispute. Williams put it on the jade-green coffee table in the drawing room, where it stayed for thirty years. John Berendt stated that Williams also had a copy of Harris Tattnall's 1978 book At Home in Savannah: Great Interiors on the coffee table during one of his visits. The Mercer House drawing room was the cover photograph.

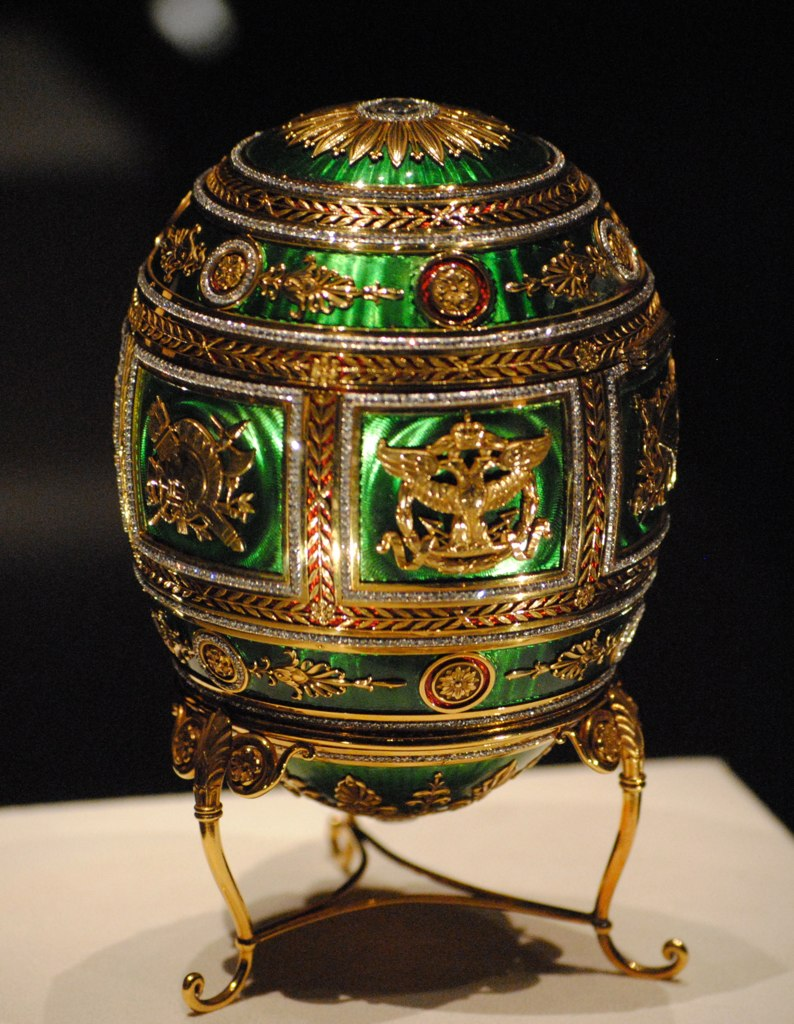
Williams had several Fabergé eggs in his collection

Williams also owned a large silver-gilt and enamel-mounted leather desk folio, with the initial N 11 and the corners decorated with Imperial eagles. It was made for Tsar Nicholas II and was purchased by Williams at a Sotheby Parke Bernet sale in New York in 1979. The folio is estimated at $25,000.

An American carved wooden eagle with outspread wings, which was perched on a bracket in the drawing room and used on the first tug boat to ply the Savannah harbor, is estimated at $4,000. More than one hundred pieces of Chinese blue and white porcelain from the Nanking cargo—a wreck of treasures which sank in the South China Sea in 1752—is also included, with an estimate of $5,500–$8,500. The Sotheby lot comprised soup plates, plates with scallop borders and plain rims, octagonal plates and a pair of large chargers with scalloped borders. They were displayed in a breakfront cabinet.

Facing the rear of the house from the drawing room, there is the music room, in which, on the left-hand side, there was a William IV mahogany sideboard, Irish, circa 1835. Above this was one of two Brussels tapestries from the 18th century, depicting a couple (possibly Venus and Adonis) embracing, with Cupid holding a shield emblazoned with a heart. Each tapestry was estimated to be around $25,000 in value. Either side of the sideboard was a pair of Regency giltwood torchères with later circular painted tops. Also in the music room was a pair of Regency fauteuils, dating from around 1730.

The piano sat across from the sideboard, in front of a French window that overlooks West Wayne Street.

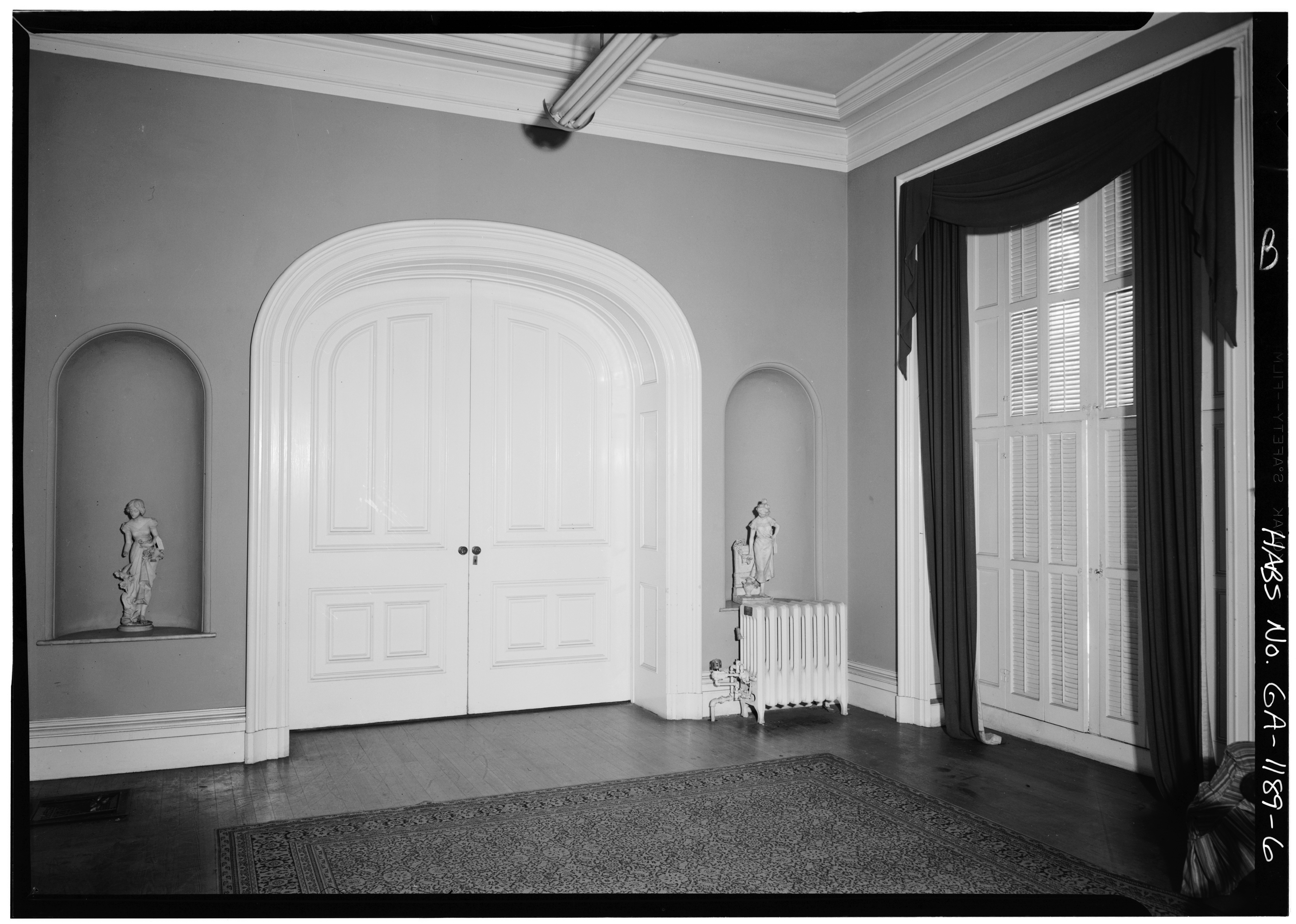
The pocket doors that lead into the library.

Through a set of pocket doors, at the right rear is the library, which includes another fireplace. Also in the library, sitting on an easel, was a framed ormolu fitting from the state carriage used at the coronation of Emperor Napoleon in 1804. After Williams's death, his sister hung a painting of him in this room, with Williams holding his cat, Sheldon.

Williams owned nine pastels on paper depicting members of the Southwell and Perceval families, attributed to artist Henrietta Johnston, with seven in their original black frames. Williams kept these in a shuttered upstairs dressing room to protect them from sunlight. Of the nine portraits, seven are inscribed Dublin, Ireland and are dated from 1704 to 1705. One, which Williams had on display in the library for a period after its purchase in early 1980, shows John Perceval, head of the Trustees for Establishing the Colony of Georgia. Williams acquired the portraits at a sale of property from Belvedere House, Westmeath County, Ireland. Williams said: "The thought of owning nine works by America's first panelist and first woman artist kept me awake the rest of the night." The nine portraits were sold together and are estimated at $100,000–125,000.

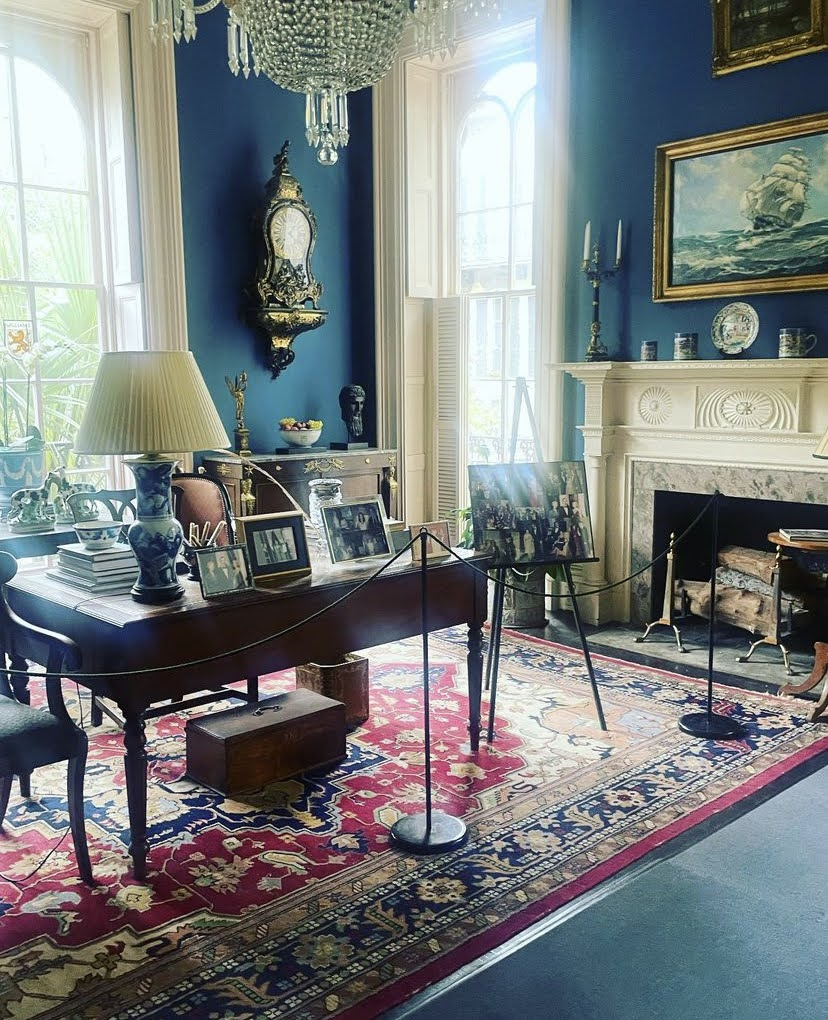
The Mercer House study (2019). Monterey Square is outside the left-hand window; West Gordon Street is outside the right

The study, where the shooting of Danny Hansford took place, is at the front left of the house, the side bounded by West Gordon Street to the south. A Louis XV ormolu-mounted Boulle marquetry bracket clock with conforming bracket hung on the wall of the study. It was signed by Laurent Dey, a master of the Paris Clockmakers' Guild. In front of the clock was a white statuary marble bust of Edward VII, English, dated 1906, by Walter Merrett, on a late-19th-century green marble column. There is also a fireplace in this room, on its southern wall.

The semi-circular staircases leading down to the basement and up to the second floor is halfway along the left side of the entrance hall, just before which was the grandfather clock that Hansford, Williams claimed, knocked over immediately prior to his death. On the right-hand wall of the entrance hall was another 18th-century Brussels tapestry, woven with silk, wool and metallic threads, depicting Diana and her nymphs bathing beside a fountain. In front of the tapestry was a Regency-period inlaid mahogany parcel-gilt side table from the early 19th century. Either side of the table was a pair of George III-style carved giltwood torchères from around 1900. Immediately inside the front door, to the left, was a George III mahogany linen press, albeit with some replacement parts.

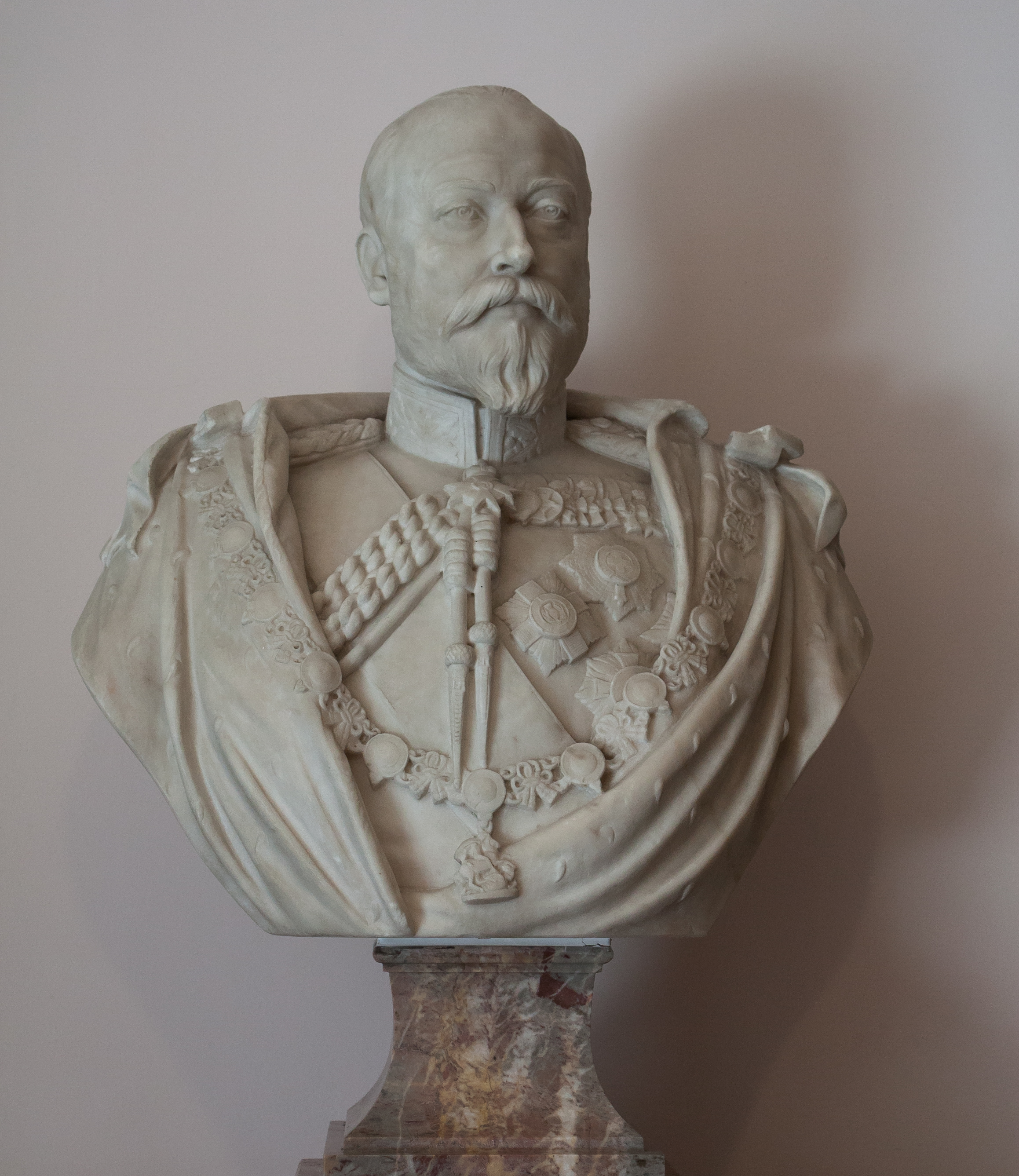
A bust of Edward VII, similar to the one in the Mercer House study

The hallway, the original ceramic floor tiles for which were imported from Stoke-on-Trent, England, was designed to double as a summer living-room.

The dining room is at the left rear, also featuring a fireplace. Above the fireplace was a Louis XVI-style painted and parcel-gilt mirror, continental, late 19th century. A pair of paintings by Thomas Hudson, portraits of Mr. and Mrs. James Hilhouse of Cornwallis House, Clifton, Bristol, were hung in this room. Also in the dining room was a Regency gilt-metal mounted dining-room pedestal, circa 1815, in the manner of Thomas Hope. The dining table was a Regency mahogany, made in the first quarter 19th century, and was in two parts. The eight chairs around it were a set of George II-style red-Japanned and parcel-gilted moderns. Also, a mahogany three-tier server, which Williams had found in poor condition in the countryside around the island of Grenada, where it is known as a "cupping table", referring to its use to hold cups and dishes beside the dining table. It is estimated at $4,000.

Williams used the carriage house, which fronts onto Whitaker Street to the west, as a guest house for visitors.

Between the house and the carriage house is a courtyard, with a brick wall connecting the house and carriage house running either side. This privacy wall was raised after the 1994 publication of Midnight in the Garden of Good and Evil.

=== Second floor ===
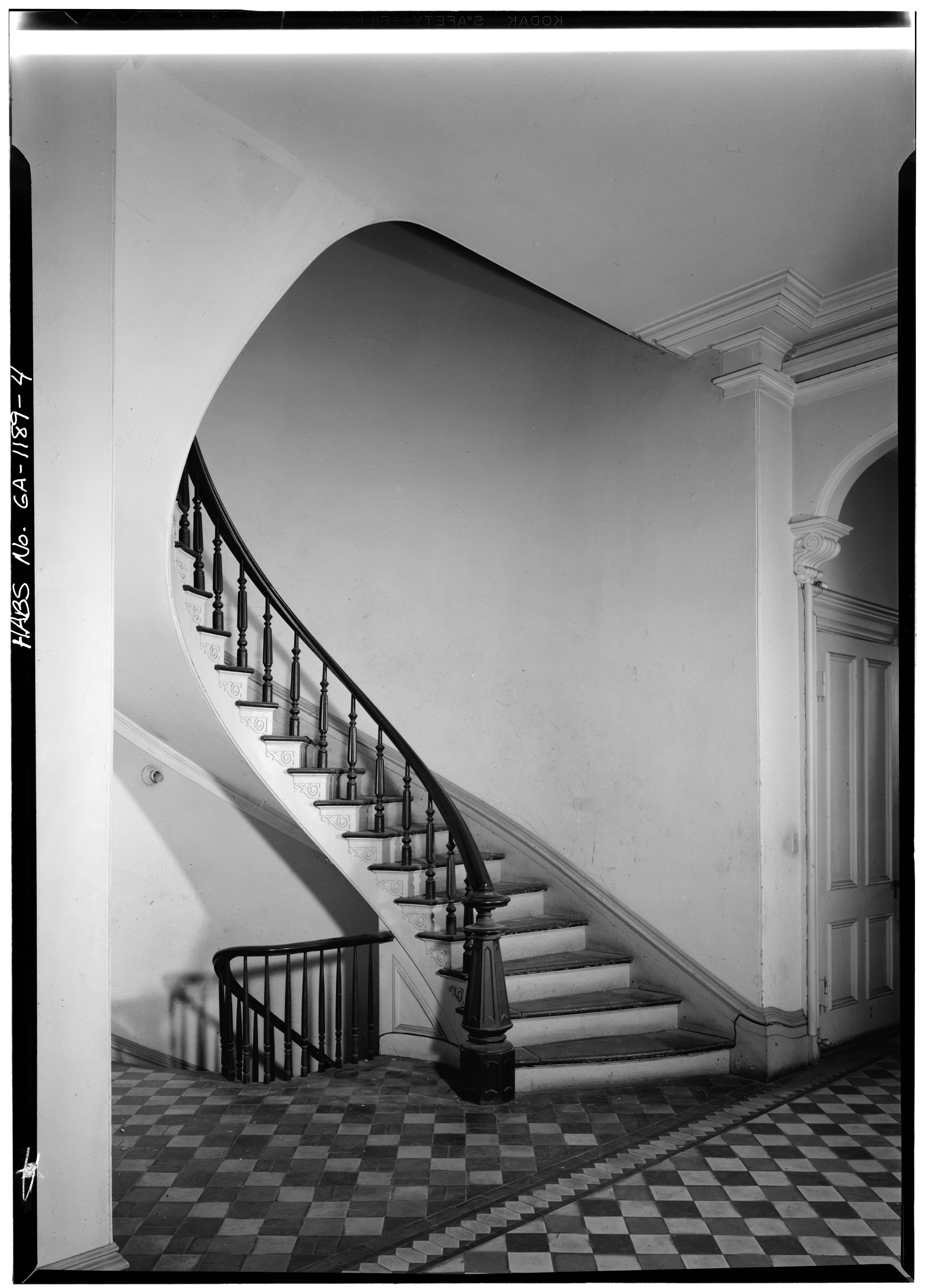
Staircase to the second floor and to the basement

Directly across the hallway from the top of the staircase, on the northern side of the house, is the ballroom. Against the wall to the right of the door to the ballroom was an eight-legged George III mahogany sofa, circa 1770. Either side of the sofa was a pair of carved polychrome and giltwood lamps in the Chinese taste. They were standing on a pair of painted wood and tole pedestals. Above the sofa was a portrait of the Reverend Rhodes by Thomas Hudson.

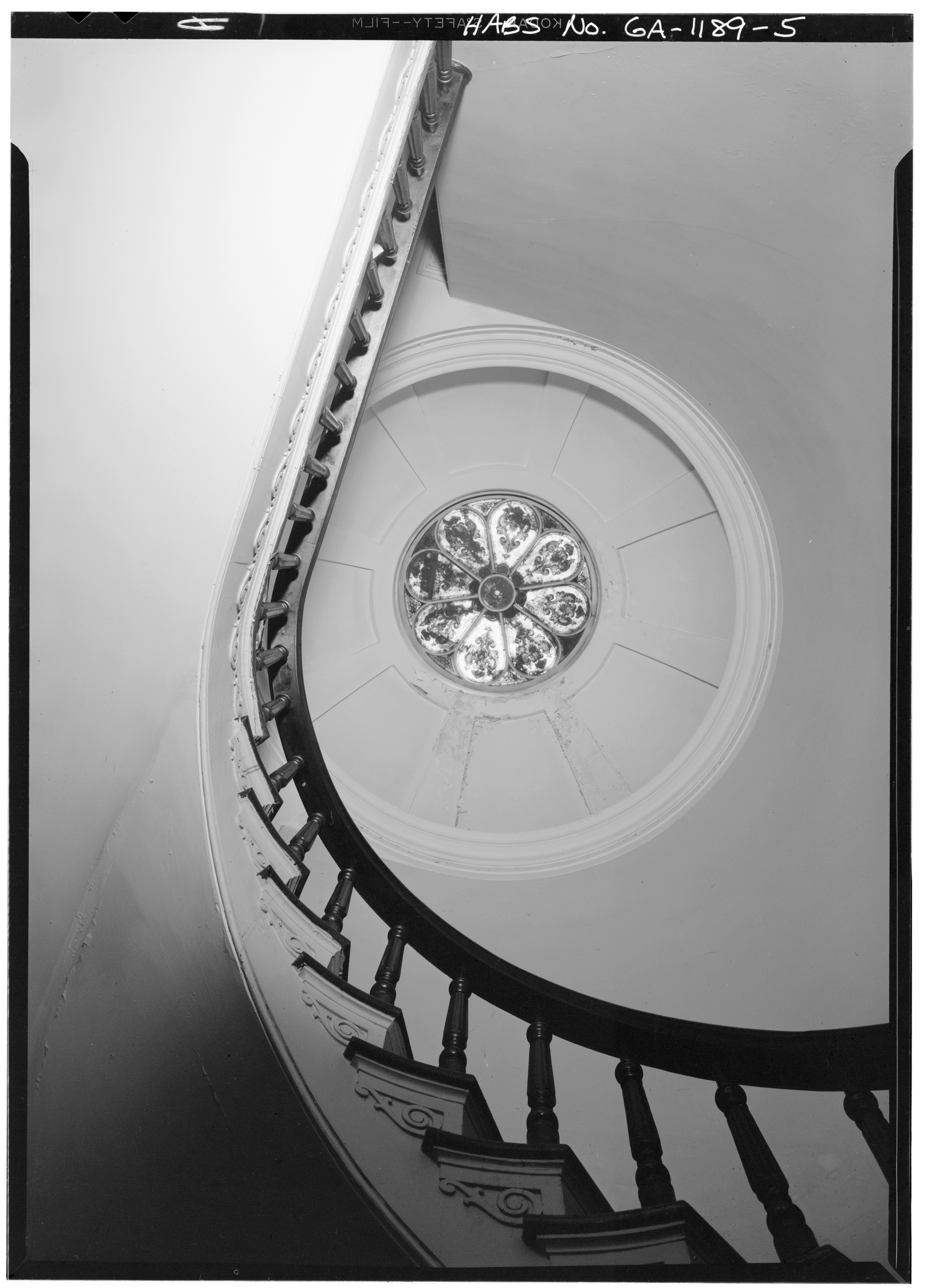
The dome skylight above the top of the spiral staircase.

Inside the ballroom was a painted and gilted modern center table with a marble top, in addition to the main attraction at the rear of the room: the pipe organ. Above the fireplace, on the northern wall, was one of a pair of Rococo-style giltwood and composition pier mirrors, American, mid-19th century, nine feet high.

The master bedroom is also on this floor, on the southern side of the house. A continental turned beechwood stool, late 17th century, with a crewelwork cover, was located in this room.

One of the two guest rooms is dominated by a mahogany four-poster bed, hand-carved in Grenada in the 19th century with foliage designs. The posts were carved with spiral flutes and a nutmeg design. It is estimated at $10,000. There were also several pieces of 19th-century furniture from Guatemala.

A stained-glass dome skylight was installed in 1868 above the top of the stairs. It contains vents to cool the house.

The second floor is not included in guided tours of the home.

=== Other furnishings ===
- A carved walnut and parcel-gilt column lamp, part 17th century.
- The dagger that, Williams claimed, Prince Felix Yusupov used to castrate Rasputin.
- A pair of legs, painted in oil and attributed to Sir Joshua Reynolds. It was customary after the 18th century, when ceiling heights were often lowered, for a painting to be cut to fit the size of a room. The legs appear to have been a victim of this downsizing. The panel is estimated at $1,500.
- A pair of crystal candlesticks which were gifted to the daughter of George and Martha Washington on her wedding day.

A portrait of Mary Marshall, founder of Savannah's Marshall House, was acquired from Williams's estate and now hangs in the lobby of the hotel.

== Historic American Buildings Survey images ==
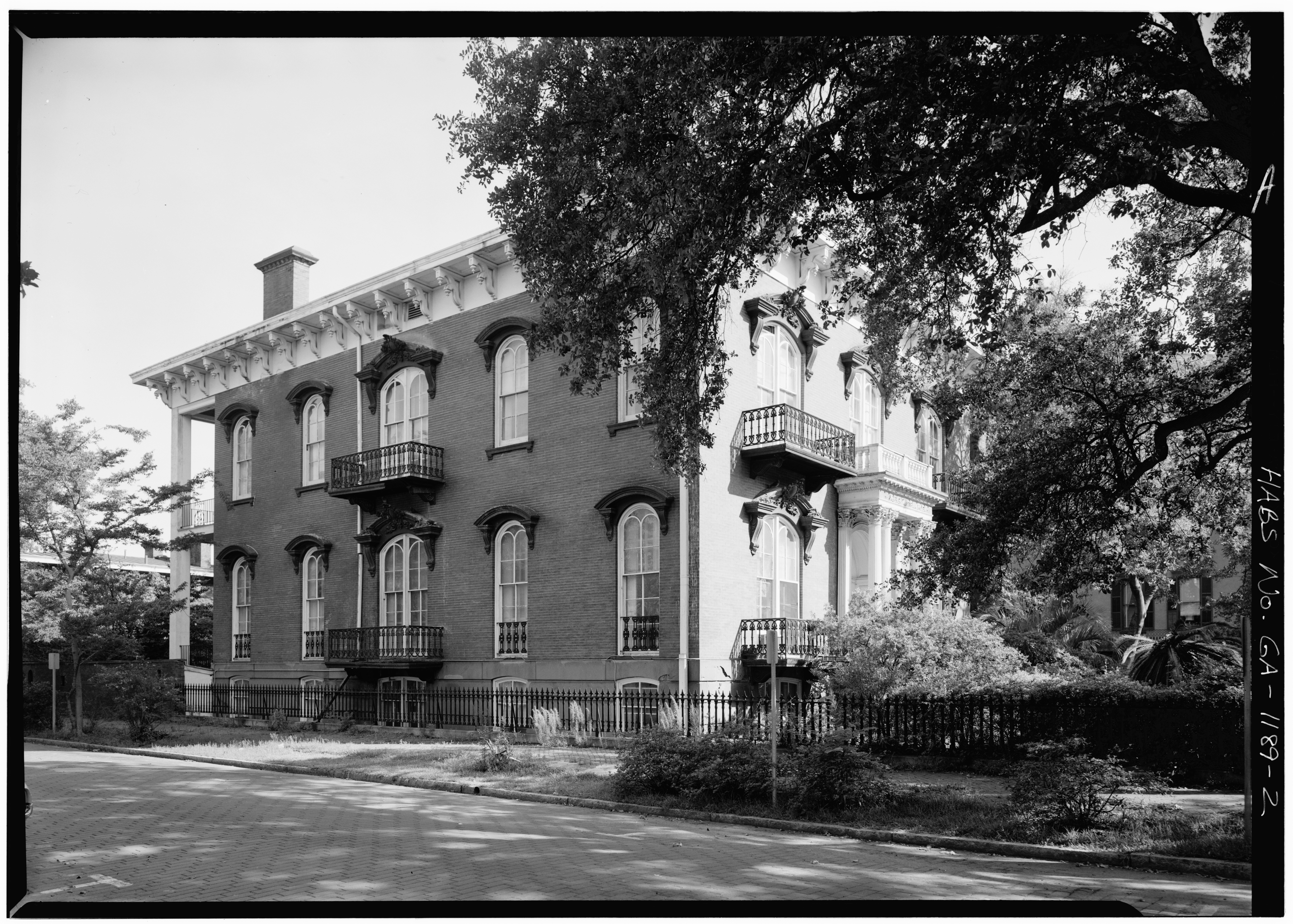
The southern façade, on West Gordon Street

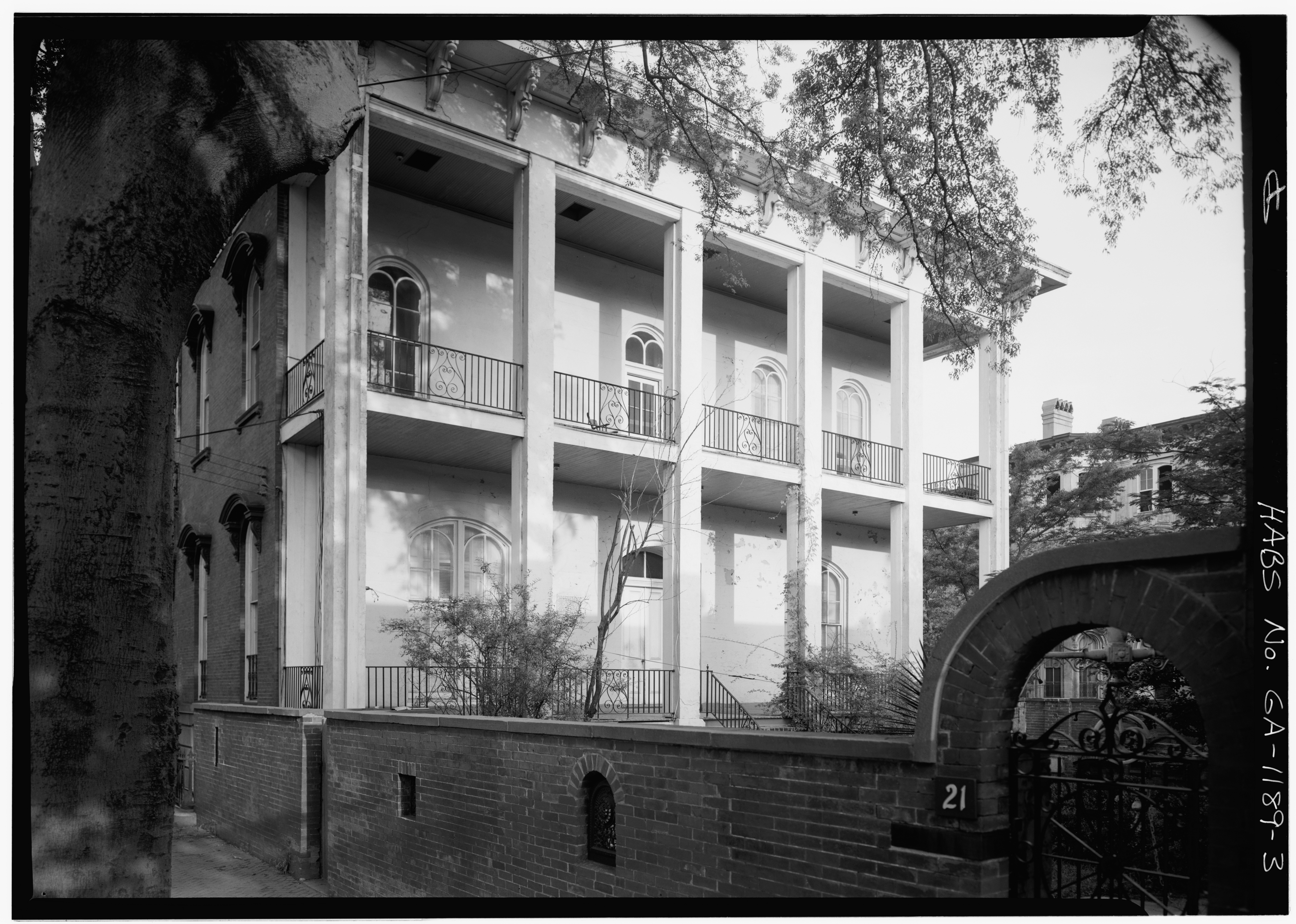
The rear of the house, viewed from West Wayne Street. The privacy wall has since been raised

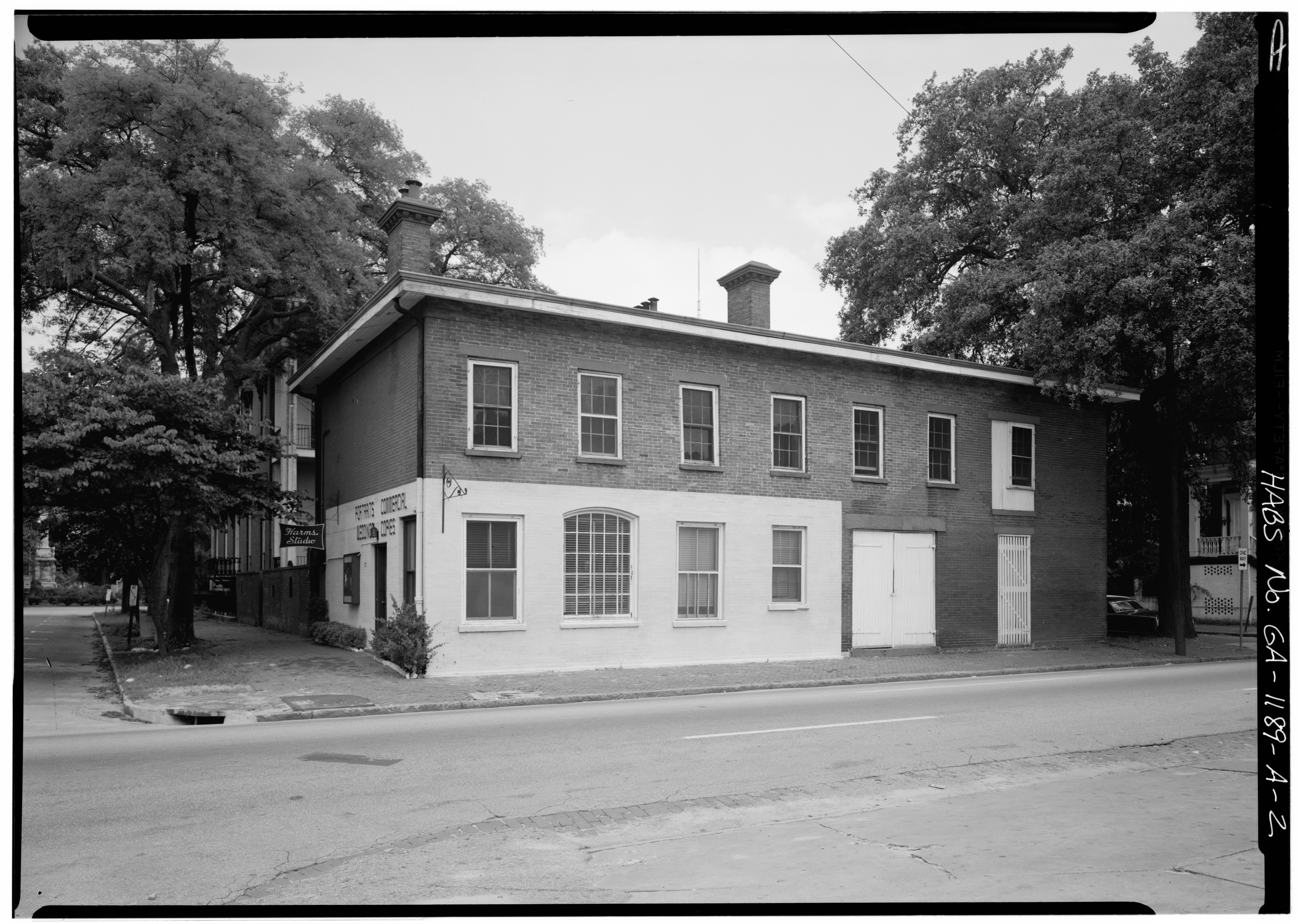
The carriage house, at the rear of the property, on Whitaker Street

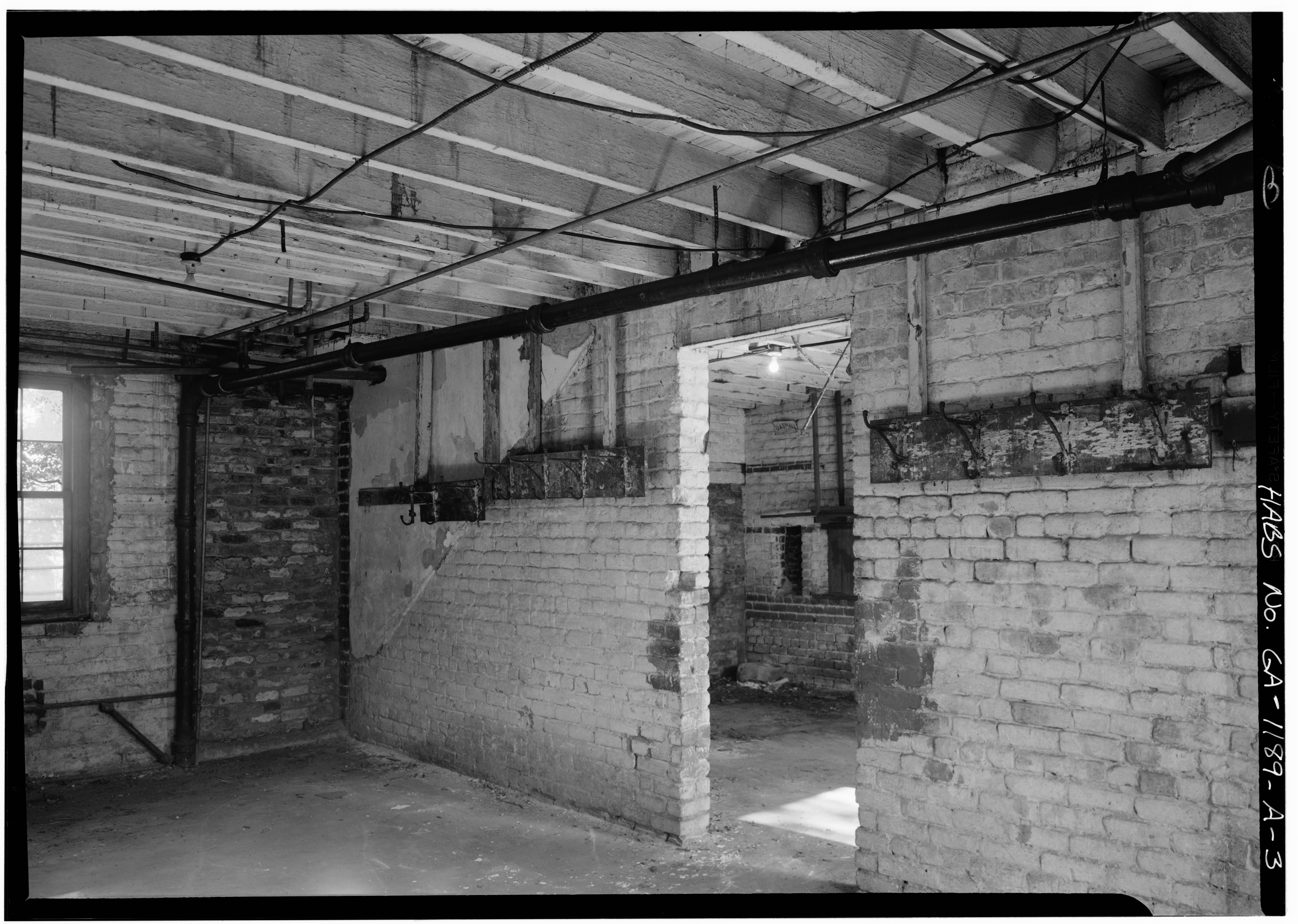
Carriage house interior
