= Chatham Artillery =

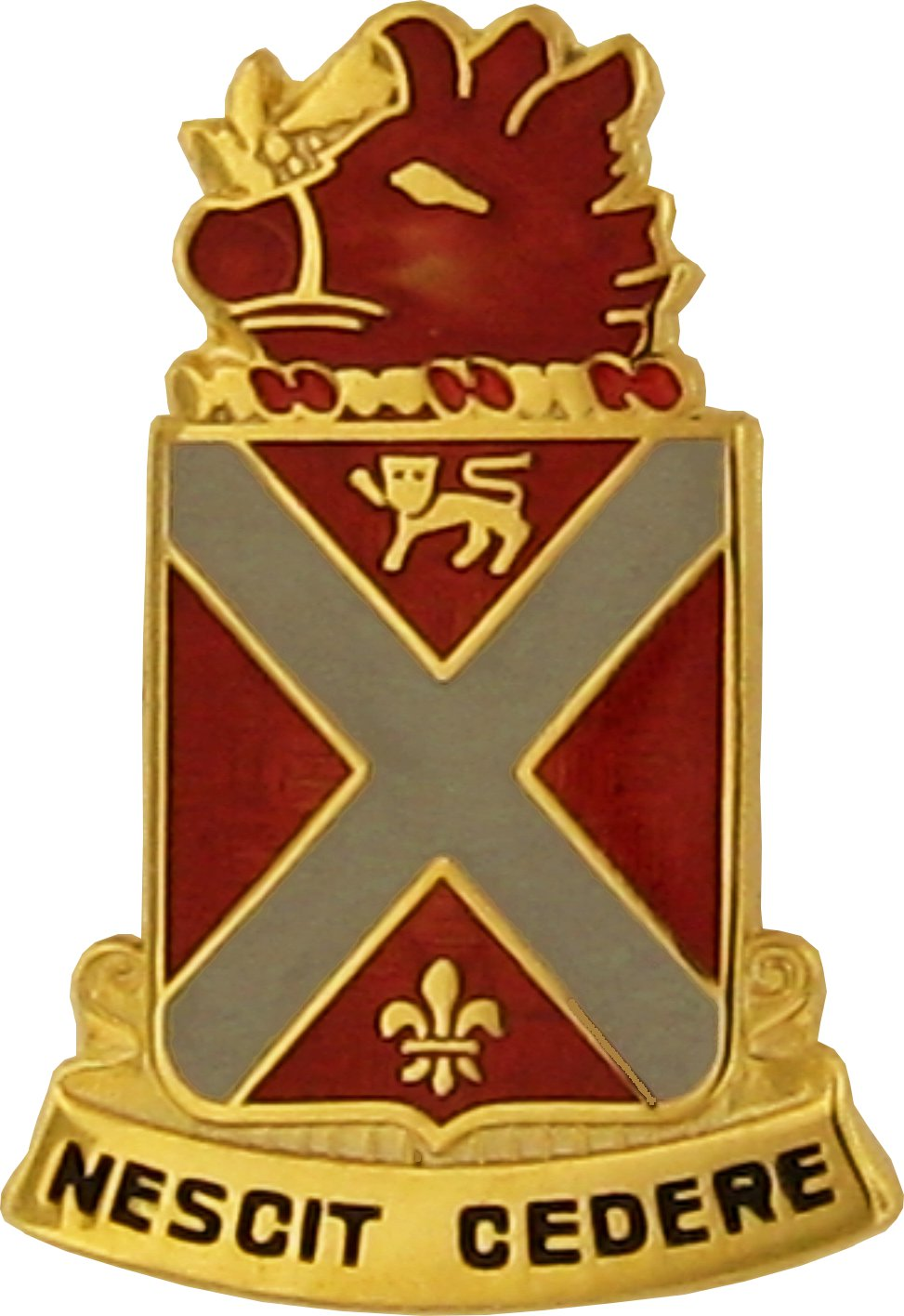
- 118th Field Artillery Regiment insignia
- Active: 1776–present
- Country: United States
- Branch: United States Army; Confederate States Army
- Type: Artillery
- Size: Battalion
- Garrison/HQ: Savannah, Georgia
- Nicknames: Savannah's Own (special designation); Lightning Brigade (former)>br>Hickory's Howitzers
- Engagements: American Revolution; Sharper's Insurrection; Oconee Wars; War of 1812; Second Seminole War; American Civil War; World War I World War II; Iraq Campaign; Afghanistan Campaign
- Decorations: Presidential Unit Citation; Meritorious Unit Commendation; French Croix de Guerre with Palm; Luxembourg Croix de Guerre; Belgian Fourragere

Commanders
- Notable commanders: Thomas Lee; Joseph Woodruff; George Wayne Anderson

The Chatham Artillery is an artillery unit that has played a leading role in the history of the state of Georgia since the American Revolution. In 1776, Thomas Lee was authorized to enlist a provincial company of artillery for the defense of Savannah, the first such unit in Georgia's history. Commanded by Joseph Woodruff, they defended the right flank of American forces when the British attacked Savannah. They saw service in the Oconnee wars, The Embargo Wars, and The War of 1812. They were part of the force that occupied Fort Pulaski that opened the American Civil War, and served in and around Savannah and Charleston South Carolina before joining General Johnston's forces in Columbia, South Carolina. After the reorganization in 1872, they mustered out to the border with Mexico, to stop Pancho Villa's raids in the United States. They served with the "Dixie Division" in France during World War I, and landed on Normandy Beach on D-day plus 4 in World War II. They breached the Siegfried Line, and were at the Elbe River when the war ended. In 2005 they were mobilized again into federal service, as an element of the 48th Brigade Combat team serving in Iraq, part of Operation Iraqi Freedom. The Chatham Artillery was re-mobilized in 2009 to support Operation Enduring Freedom in Afghanistan, personally training Afghan Troops and Police Forces. They were demobilized in 2010 at Fort Stewart, Georgia. Today they remain in service, as a modular artillery brigade of the Georgia Army National Guard, the 118th Field Artillery.

As part of the 48th Infantry Brigade, the 118th FA is one of the oldest units in US Army history. It is one of few units in the US military that also saw service as a unit of the Confederate States of America during the US Civil War.

== Heraldry ==
A gold-color metal-and-enamel device 1 1/8 inches (2.86 cm) in height, consisting of the coat of arms of the regiment blazoned: SHIELD: Gules, a saltire Gray fimbriated Or, in chief a lion passant guardant, in base a fleur-de-lis, of the last. CREST: On a wreath of the colors, Or and Gules, a boar's head erased Gules, in the mouth an oak branch Or. Attached below the shield an arced Gold scroll inscribed "NESCIT CEDERE" in Black.

Scarlet is the color traditionally associated with artillery organizations. The lion and fleur-de-lis denote service in the Revolutionary War and World War I, respectively. The gray saltire represents Civil War service as Confederate troops.

== History and lineage ==
The 1st Battalion, 118th Field Artillery Regiment, traces its lineage to the 118th Field Artillery which was organized on April 18, 1751, in the Georgia Militia in the District of Savannah as four independent volunteer companies, 3 of foot and one of horse. It was mustered into service of the colony June 11, 1751, at Savannah under the command of Captain Noble Jones. It was reorganized on April 2, 1757, as the 1st Regiment of Foot Militia, Division of Savannah, under the command of Colonel Noble Jones.

There is a punch called Chatham Artillery Punch that is named after the regiment.

=== American Revolutionary War ===
It was reorganized on April 2, 1757, as the 1st Regiment of Foot Militia, Division of Savannah, under the command of Colonel Noble Jones; in January 1776 with two battalions (Savannah and Christ Church Parish in the 1st Battalion). It was disbanded on January 29, 1778, at Savannah when the city was captured by the British.

It was reorganized in 1782 in the Georgia Militia as the 1st Regiment (Savannah and Chatham County in the 1st Battalion), 1st Brigade, 1st Division. The 1st Battalion (Chatham Battalion), 1st Regiment, expanded, reorganized, and was redesignated in 1784 as the 1st Regiment (Chatham Regiment), 1st Brigade, 1st Division.

=== George Washington visits Savannah in 1791 ===
When George Washington visited Savannah on May 12, 1791, the Chatham Artillery saluted him with 26 discharges from their field guns. The company found such favor with the President, that he sent a gift of two field pieces captured at Yorktown on October 19, 1781. These "Washington Guns" are still on display in Savannah today near the city hall. Two historical markers there outline the history of the guns.

First marker:

These bronze cannon were presented to the Chatham Artillery by President Washington after his visit to Savannah in 1791. Of English and French make, respectively, they are excellent examples of the art of ordnance manufacture in the 18th century.

An inscription on the British 6 pounder states that it was "surrendered by the capitulation of York Town Oct. 19, 1781." The English cannon was cast in 1783 during the reign of George II and the royal insignia and motto of the Order of the Garter appear on its barrel.

The French gun was manufactured at Strasburg in 1756. On its elaborately engraved barrel appear the coat of arms of Louis XIV: the sun which was the emblem of that monarch, and a Latin inscription (which Louis XIV first ordered placed on French cannon) meaning "Last Argument of Kings." The dolphins were emblematic of the Dauphin of France. The gun was individually named "La Populaire."

Reminders of America's hard-won struggle for Independence and of the great man who led the Continental forces in the Revolution, the historic "Washington Guns" were placed on public display here through the co-operation of the Chatham Artillery and the City of Savannah.

Second marker:

These cannon, which were captured when Lord Cornwallis surrendered at Yorktown in the American Revolution, were a gift to the Chatham Artillery by President George Washington – a mark of his appreciation for the part the local military company played in the celebration of his visit to Savannah in May 1791. Washington commended the Chatham Artillery in "warmest terms" and at one of the functions in his honor (which took place on the river bluff east of this spot) proposed a toast "to the present dexterous Corps of Artillery."

The "Washington Guns" have thundered a welcome to many distinguished visitors to Savannah, including James Monroe, the Marquis de Lafayette, James K. Polk, Millard Fillmore, Chester A. Arthur, Jefferson Davis, Grover Cleveland, William McKinley, William H. Taft, and Franklin D. Roosevelt.

During the War Between the States the historic cannon were buried for safety beneath the Chatham Artillery armory and were not removed until 1872 when the Federal occupation troops had departed.

The guns were fired to salute President James Monroe when he visited Savannah in May 1819 for the launching of the S.S. Savannah, the first steamship to cross the Atlantic Ocean.

The "Washington Guns" were taken to Yorktown in 1881 by a contingent of the Chatham Artillery and led the parade at the centennial celebration of Cornwallis' surrender.

=== National expansion and reform ===
It reorganized in March 1793 to consist of the 1st (or city) Battalion in Savannah and the 2nd (or county) Battalion in Chatham County; and reorganized again wholly in Savannah in December 1807.

The Savannah Volunteer Guards (Organized in 1802) and the Republican Blues (Organized in 1808) were mustered into Federal service in east Florida in June 1812 as elements of Colonel David Newman's provisional battalion of Georgia Volunteers, and mustered out of Federal service in October 1812. Heavy Artillery Company (organized in 1812) mustered into Federal service October 19, 1812, at Fort Jackson, Georgia; and mustered out of Federal service November 23, 1812.

The unit was mustered into Federal service on January 22, 1815, at Savannah as the 1st Regiment, Georgia Volunteers; and mustered out of Federal service on February 23, 1815 (the volunteer companies in the 1st Regiment, Georgia Militia, reorganized on December 13, 1829, as the Chatham Legion; while the Irish Jasper Greens, organized in 1842, were mustered into Federal service on June 12, 1846, at Columbus as Company F, 1st Regiment, Georgia Volunteers; and mustered out of Federal service May 26, 1847, at New Orleans, Louisiana).

The Volunteer companies (Chatham Legion) were withdrawn on January 20, 1852, from the 1st Regiment and reorganized as the Independent Volunteer Battalion of Savannah to consist of the following companies:

- Chatham Artillery (organized in 1785)
- Savannah Volunteer Guards (organized in 1802)
- Republican Blues (organized in 1808)
- Phoenix Riflemen (organized in 1812)
- Irish Jasper Greens (organized in 1842)
- German Volunteers (organized in 1845)
- DeKalb Riflemen (organized in 1850)

The 1st Regiment, Georgia Militia, reorganized with new companies – hereafter separate lineage.

=== American Civil War ===
The unit was redesignated on May 17, 1856, as the Independent Volunteer Regiment of Savannah; on December 20, 1859, as the 1st Volunteer Regiment of Georgia. It was ordered into active state service on January 2, 1861, to take possession of Fort Pulaski in the Savannah harbor and mustered into Confederate service by elements May–July 1861. The Chatham Artillery detached from the regiment on September 28, 1861, and reorganized as an independent light battery (Claghorn's or Wheaton's Georgia battery); they surrendered April 26, 1865, near Greensboro, North Carolina. A portion of the regiment was captured on April 11, 1862, at the surrender of Fort Pulaski.

The Savannah Volunteer Guards detached from the regiment on April 11, 1862, and were expanded, reorganized, and redesignated as the 18th Battalion, Georgia Infantry: they surrendered on April 26, 1865, at Appomattox Court House, Virginia. The Phoenix Riflemen detached from the regiment and were expanded, reorganized, and redesignated as the 13th Battalion, Georgia Infantry: they were absorbed on December 23, 1862, by the 63d Georgia Volunteer Infantry Regiment. The regiment itself reorganized in October 1862 as the 1st Georgia Volunteer Infantry Regiment upon exchange of elements captured at Fort Pulaski. It consolidated in April 1865 with the 57th and 63d Georgia Volunteer Infantry Regiments and was redesignated as the 1st Georgia Composite Infantry Regiment. It surrendered on April 26, 1865, near Durham, North Carolina.

=== Reconstruction era ===
The former 1st Volunteer Regiment (Chatham Regiment) of Georgia reorganized on September 26, 1872, in the Georgia Volunteers at Savannah as the 1st Infantry Regiment. Its elements consolidated with elements of the 2d and 4th Infantry Regiments and mustered into Federal service on May 11, 1898, at Griffin as the 1st Georgia Volunteer Infantry: it mustered out of Federal service on November 18, 1898, at Macon and resumed state status as the 1st Regiment of Infantry (The Georgia Volunteers were redesignated on December 21, 1899, as the Georgia State Troops: and on October 1, 1905, as the Georgia National Guard).

=== World War I ===
The unit was drafted into Federal service on August 5, 1917. It converted and was redesignated on September 23, 1917, as the 118th Field Artillery and assigned to the 31st Division. It demobilized January 14–18, 1919 Camp Gordon, Georgia.

Reorganized in 1921 in the Georgia National Guard as the 1st Field Artillery, its headquarters was Federally recognized on December 30, 1921, at Savannah. The unit was redesignated on April 27, 1922, as the 118th Field Artillery and assigned to the 30th Division. Battery A (Chatham Artillery) was withdrawn on April 17, 1925, and reorganized as Headquarters and Headquarters Battery, 55th Field Artillery Brigade, an element of the 30th Division.

=== Interwar era ===
Reorganized in 1921 in the Georgia National Guard as the 1st Field Artillery, its headquarters was Federally recognized on December 30, 1921, at Savannah. The unit was redesignated on April 27, 1922, as the 118th Field Artillery and assigned to the 30th Division. Battery A (Chatham Artillery) was withdrawn on April 17, 1925, and reorganized as Headquarters and Headquarters Battery, 55th Field Artillery Brigade, an element of the 30th Division.

The 118th Field Artillery and Headquarters and Headquarters Battery, 55th Field Artillery Brigade, was inducted into Federal service on September 16, 1940, at Savannah. Headquarters and Headquarters Battery, 55th Field Artillery Brigade, reorganized and was redesignated on February 7, 1942, as Headquarters and Headquarters Battery (Georgia part), 30th Division Artillery; the 118th Field Artillery was concurrently broken up and its elements reorganized and were redesignated as elements of the 30th Infantry Division as Headquarters and Headquarters Battery and the 1st battalion as the 118th Field Artillery Battalion and 2d Battalion as the 230th Field Artillery Battalion.

=== World War II ===
After February 7, 1942, the above units underwent changes as follows: Headquarters and Headquarters Battery, 30th Division Artillery, inactivated on November 20, 1945, at Fort Jackson, South Carolina. It was redesignated on July 5, 1946, as Headquarters and Headquarters Battery (Georgia part), 48th Division Artillery. It was reorganized and Federally recognized on June 18, 1947, at Savannah; and on November 1, 1955, as Headquarters and Headquarters Battery, 48th Armored Division Artillery.

The 118th Field Artillery Battalion inactivated on November 20, 1945, at Fort Jackson, South Carolina. It was relieved on July 5, 1946, from assignment to the 30th Infantry Division. It reorganized and was Federally recognized on April 21, 1947, at Savannah before being reorganized and redesignated on November 1, 1955, as the 118th Armored Field Artillery Battalion and assigned to the 48th Armored Division.

The 230th Field Artillery inactivated on November 20, 1945, at Fort Jackson, South Carolina. It was relieved on July 5, 1946, from assignment to the 30th Infantry Division and assigned to the 48th Infantry Division. It reorganized and was Federally recognized on April 22, 1947, at Savannah, before being reorganized and redesignated on November 1, 1955, as the 230th Armored Field Artillery Battalion (the 48th Infantry Division concurrently reorganized and was redesignated as the 48th Armored Division).

=== Cold War ===
The 118th and 230th Field Artillery Battalions consolidated on July 1, 1959, and the consolidated unit was reorganized and redesignated as the 118th Field Artillery, a parent regiment under the Combat Arms Regimental system, to consist of the 1st and 2d Howitzer Battalions, elements of the 48th Armored Division. It reorganized on April 16, 1963, to consist of the 1st, 2d, and 3d Battalions, elements of the 48th Armored Division. The regiment was broken up on January 1, 1968, and its elements reorganized and were redesignated, with Headquarters, Headquarters and Service Battery, 1st Battalion, consolidated with Headquarters and Headquarters Battery, 48th Armored Division Artillery, and the consolidated unit reorganized and was redesignated as Headquarters and Headquarters Battery, 118th Artillery Group (remainder of regiment – hereafter separate lineage). It was redesignated on May 9, 1978, as Headquarters and Headquarters Battery, 118th Field Artillery Brigade.

It consolidated on September 1, 1992, with the 230th Field Artillery which was constituted on December 14, 1967, in the Georgia Army National Guard as the 230th Artillery, a parent regiment under the Combat Arms Regimental System, organized on January 1, 1968, from existing units to consist of the 1st Battalion, an element of the 30th Infantry Division and redesignated on May 1, 1972, as the 230th Field Artillery. It was reorganized on December 1, 1973, to consist of the 1st Battalion, an element of the 48th Infantry Brigade before being withdrawn on June 1, 1989, from the Combat Arms Regimental System and reorganized under the United States Army Regimental System with headquarters at Waycross (1st Battalion ordered into active Federal service on November 30, 1990, at home stations: released on March 27, 1991, from active Federal service and reverted to state control).

The resulting consolidated unit reorganized and was redesignated as the 118th Field Artillery, a parent regiment under the United States Army Regimental System, with headquarters at Savannah, to consist of the 1st Battalion, an element of the 48th Infantry Brigade.

=== Operation Iraqi Freedom ===
As part of Operation Iraqi Freedom, the 1–118th FA took over responsibility for a part of 3rd Brigade, 1st Armored Division's area of operations previously patrolled by 1st Squadron, 11th Armored Cavalry Regiment in Taji, Iraq.

In October 2004, the 48th Infantry Brigade was notified that it would be mobilized into federal service. It was destined to fight in the Iraq War. Elements of the brigade began mobilizing in December 2004 at Fort Stewart, Georgia, with the remainder of the brigade entering federal service in early January 2005. The brigade completed five months of training, including a rotation at the National Training Center, Fort Irwin, California and was validated as combat-ready.

In May 2005, the unit began deploying to Iraq as part of Operation Iraqi Freedom III (the third major U.S. military rotation of forces into the area of operations) and experienced some of the fiercest combat actions in the campaign. The brigade was assigned to Multi-National Division - Baghdad under the control of the 3rd Infantry Division and was responsible for a sector of southwest Baghdad, nicknamed the "Triangle of Death." It replaced the 2nd Brigade, 10th Mountain Division. The brigade was headquartered at Camp Stryker, part of the Victory Base Complex (VBC). Elements of the 48th Brigade occupied and maintained forward operating bases (FOBs) in Mahmudiyah, Lutifiyah, Latifiyah, and Yusifiyah; and established a new joint United States/Iraqi Army permanent patrol base, designated PB Lion's Den, located to the west of the Radwaniyah Palace Complex.

(ITO) security mission from the 56th Brigade Combat Team. The 2nd Brigade, 101st Airborne Division replaced 48th Brigade units in Baghdad. The brigade's headquarters relocated to Camp Adder (also known as Ali Air Base or Tallil Air Base) in the vicinity of Nasiriyah, Iraq, and the brigade had elements stationed as far south as Kuwait to as far north as Mosul, and as far west as the Syrian border.

On April 20, 2006, at Ft. Stewart, more than 4,000 members of the brigade began to return home after a year of combat operations in Iraq. The April 20 arrival marked the first of nearly a dozen flights over the subsequent weeks that brought the soldiers back to Georgia.

=== Operation Enduring Freedom ===
In December 2007, the 48th Infantry Brigade Combat Team was alerted that it will be deployed to Afghanistan in the summer of 2009 in support of Operation Enduring Freedom (OEF). This rotation reflected the continued U.S. commitment to assisting in the security of Afghanistan and the development of the Afghan National Security Forces.

The first elements of the 48th Brigade began training in January 2009 in preparation for a year-long deployment to Afghanistan.

In 2009, more than 3000 Guardsmen deployed from the 1st Battalion, 121st Infantry, headquartered in Winder, Georgia; 2nd Battalion, 121st Infantry, headquartered in Griffin, Georgia; 1st Battalion, 118th Field Artillery, headquartered in Savannah, Georgia; 1st Battalion, 108th Cavalry, headquartered in Calhoun, Georgia; 148th Brigade Special Troops Battalion, headquartered in Statesboro, Georgia; and the 48th Brigade Support Battalion, headquartered in Dublin, Georgia to support Operation Enduring Freedom.[8] The 48th IBCT returned home in March 2010 after being replaced by the 86th IBCT (MTN).

=== Current status ===
The Chatham Artillery is currently organized as the 1st Battalion, 118th Field Artillery regiment of the Georgia National Guard's 48th Infantry Brigade Combat Team. The 48th Infantry Brigade was selected to participate in the Associated Units pilot program. The program establishes a formal relationship between the reserve and active duty components, allowing units to train and eventually deploy together. The 48th Brigade will be paired with Task Force 1–28th Infantry Regiment stationed at Fort Benning, Ga. The brigade will also be associated with the active Army's 3rd Infantry Division at Fort Stewart, Ga. The Soldiers of the 48th Brigade will wear the 3rd Infantry Division patch, but will retain the 48th Brigade "Macon Volunteers" designation.

== Current organization ==
- 1st Battalion, 118th Field Artillery "Hickory's Howitzers"
  - Headquarters and Headquarters Battery (HHB) Savannah, Georgia "Chatham Artillery"
  - Alpha Battery (105mm) Springfield, Georgia
  - Bravo Battery (105mm) Brunswick, Georgia
  - Charlie Battery (155mm) Savannah, Georgia "Jasper Rifles"
  - Fox Company 148th Brigade Support Battalion (F-148th BSB) Savannah, Georgia

== Gallery ==
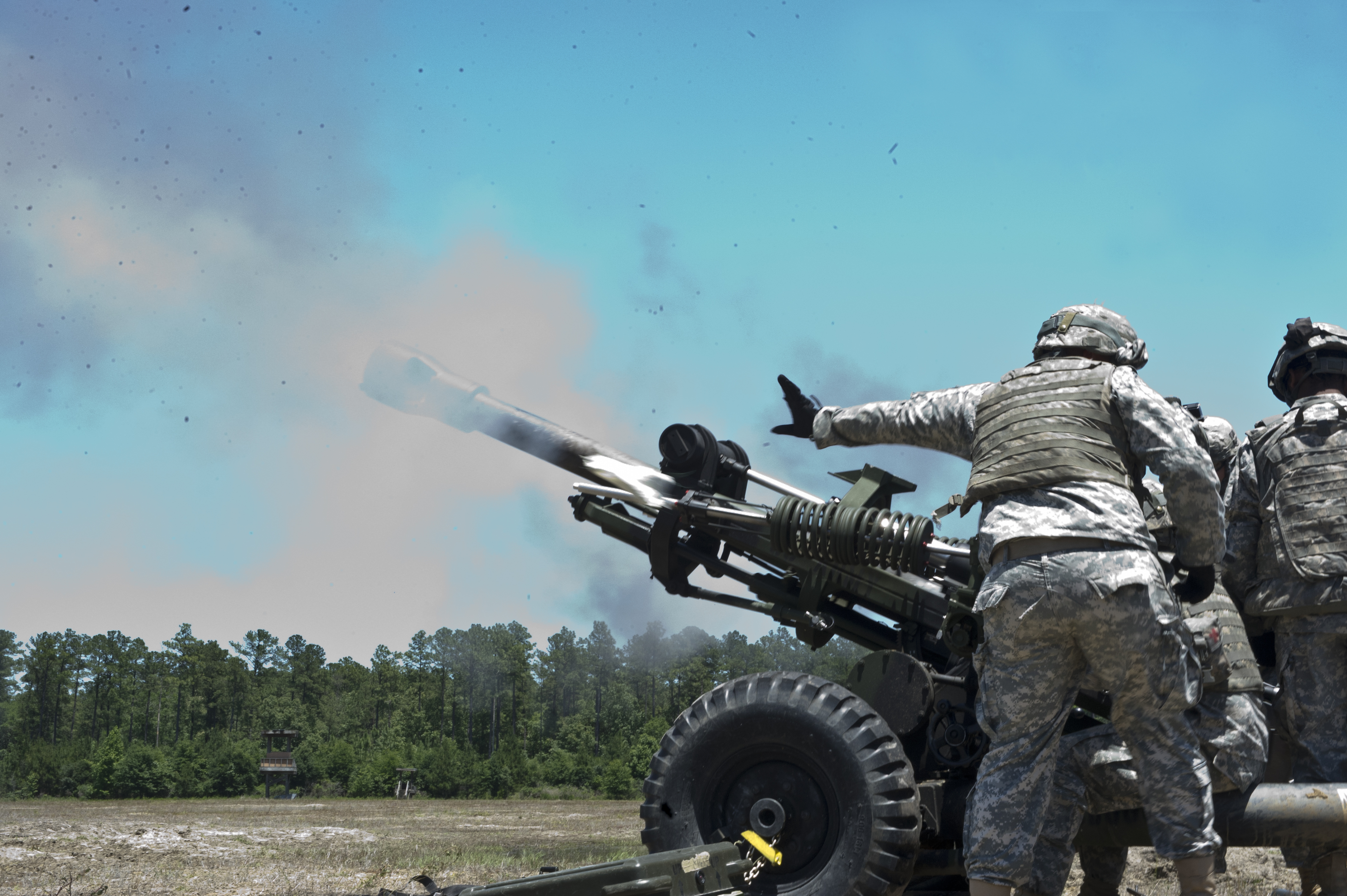
Georgia Guard 118th Field Artillery

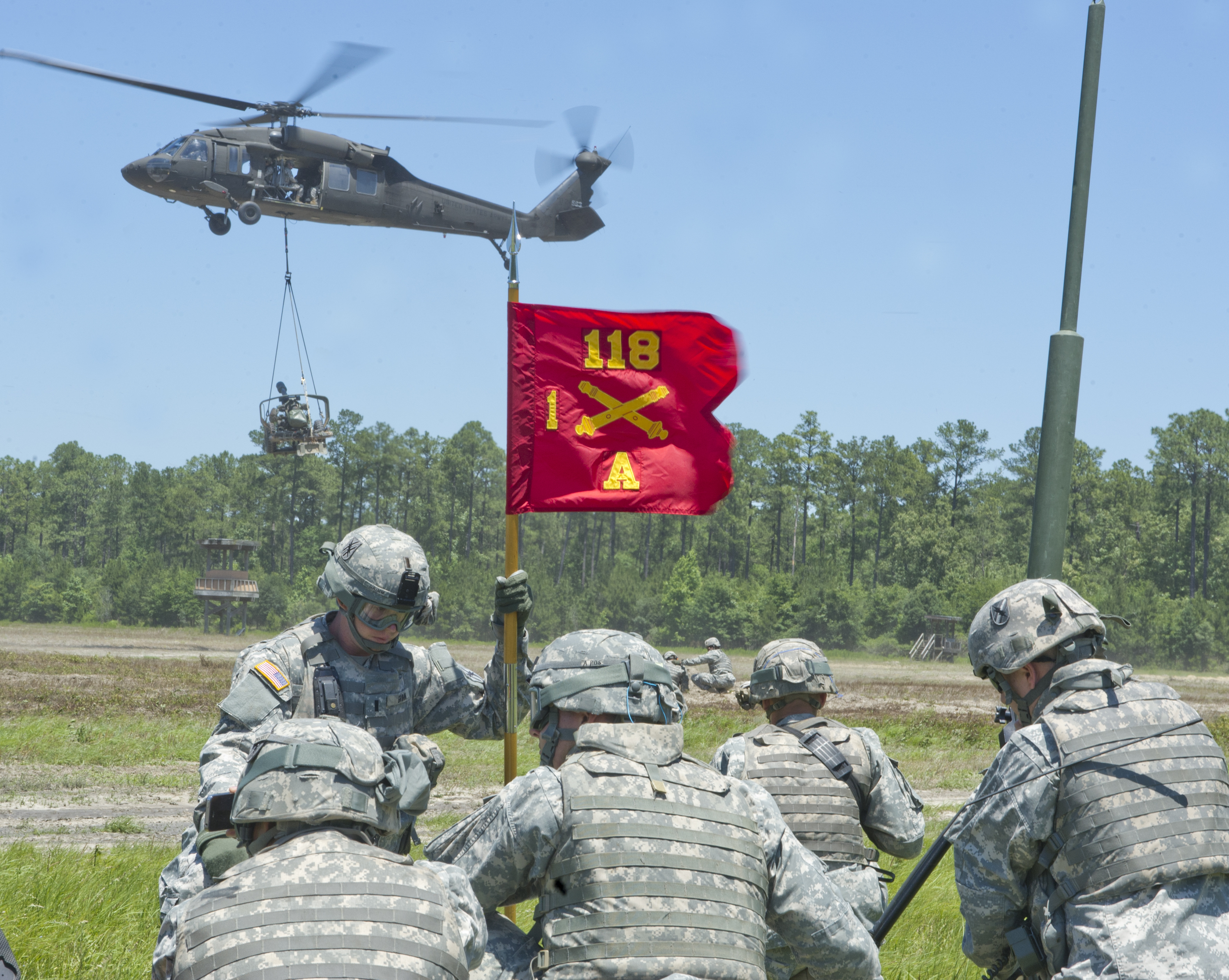
Georgia Guard 118th Field Artillery

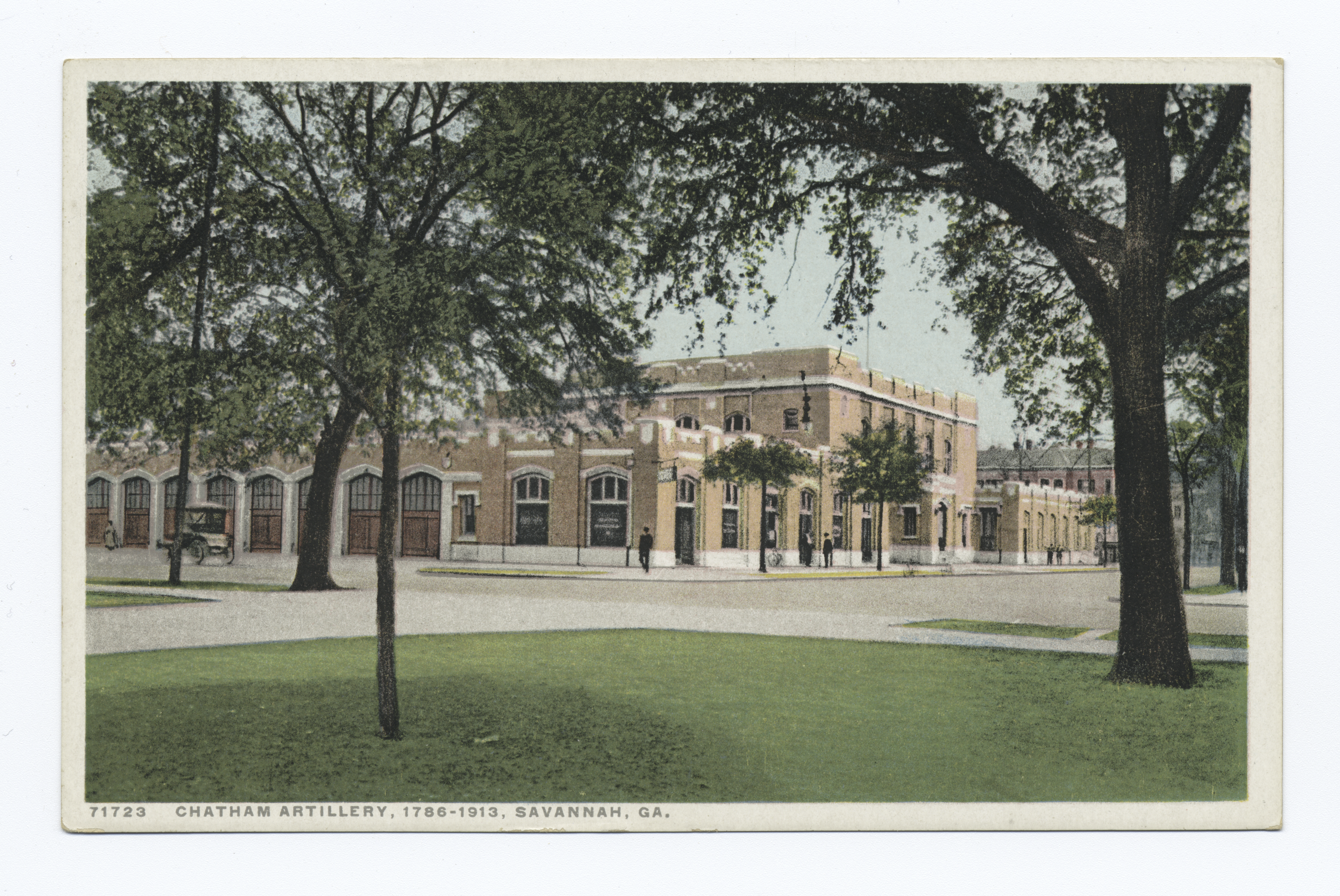
Chatham Artillery, 1786-1913, Savannah, Ga

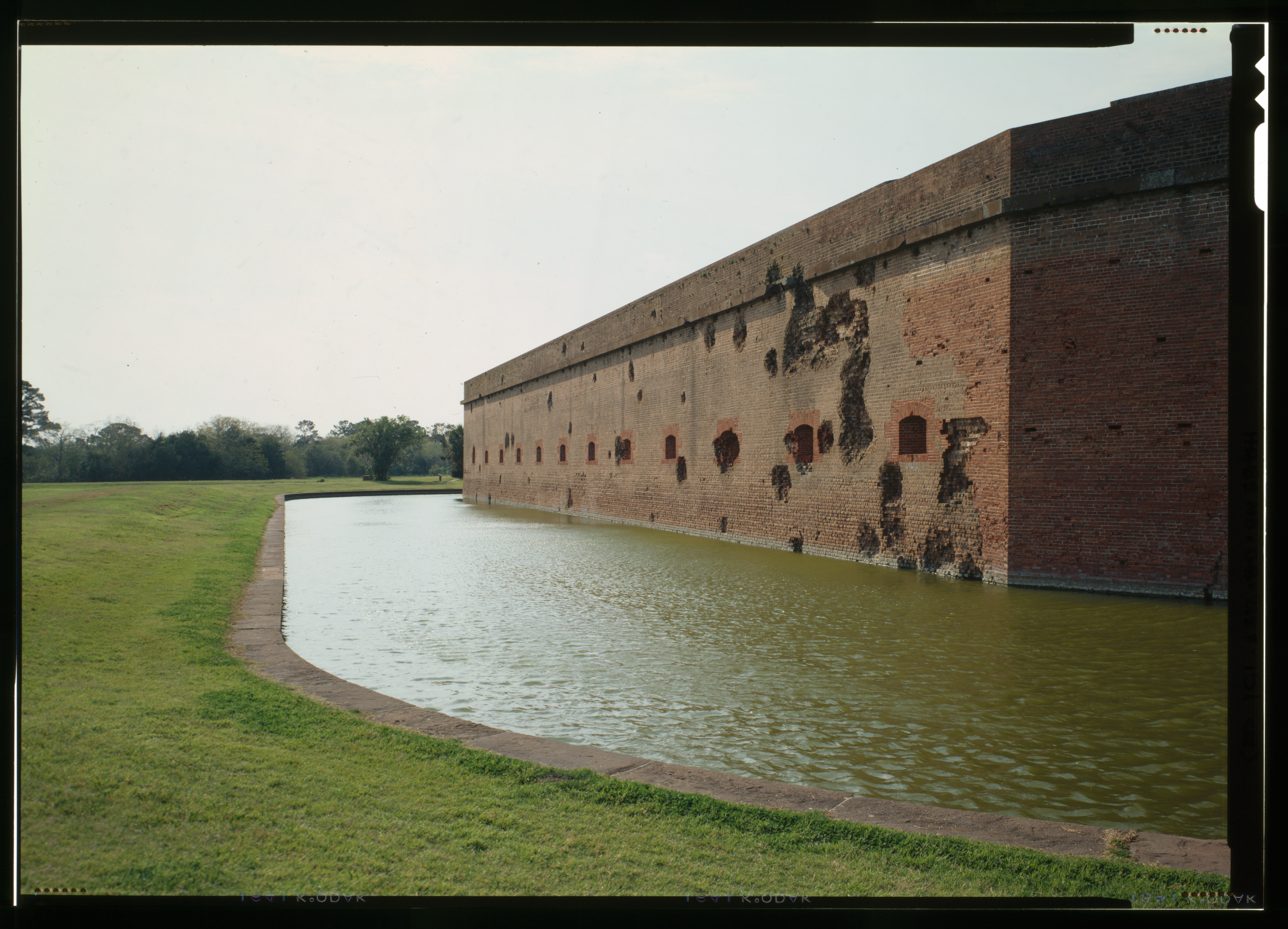
Southern Wall Union Artillery damage 1862

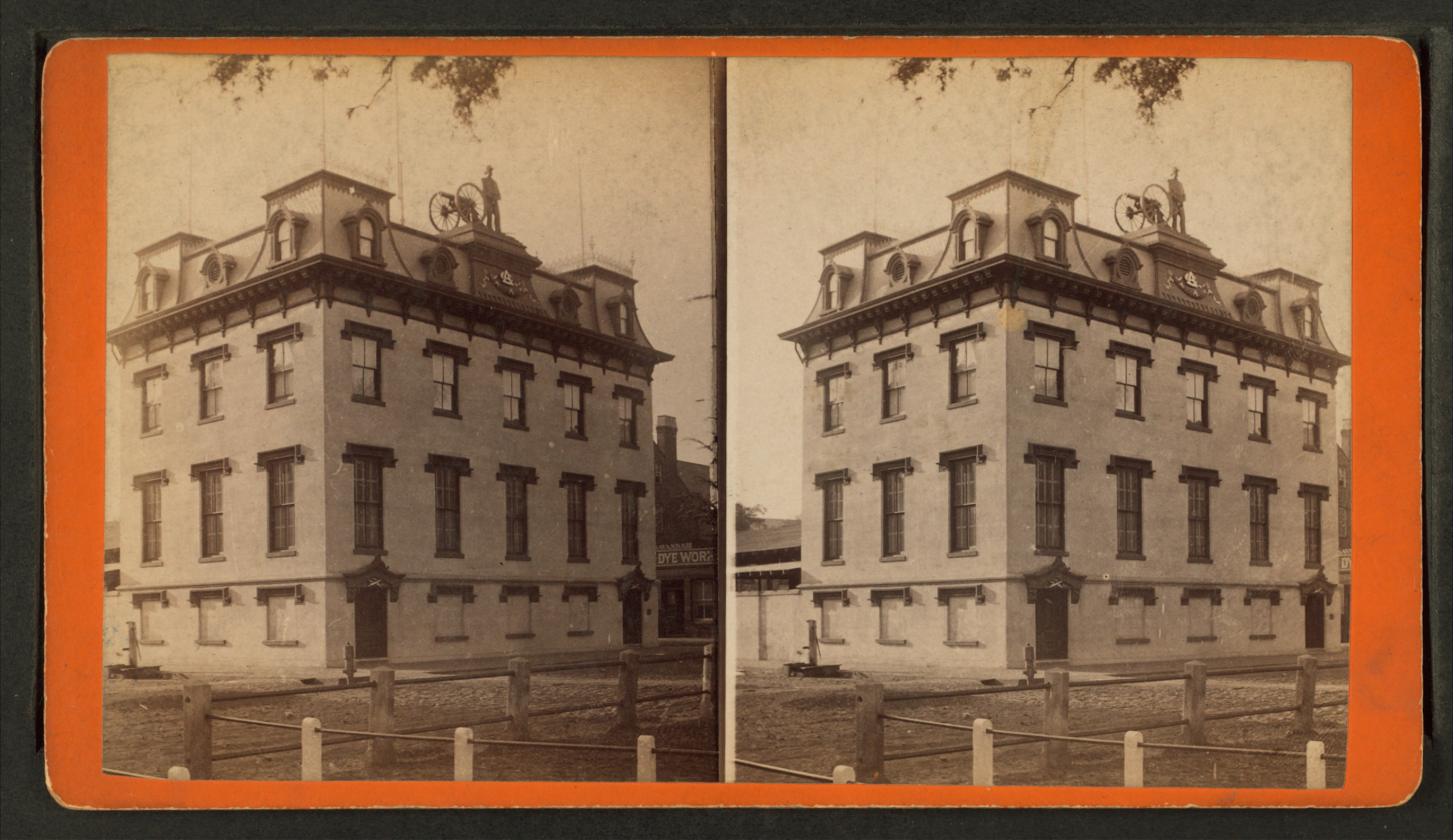
Chatham Artillery building, with a cannon and revolutionary war figure on the roof, by Launey & Goebel

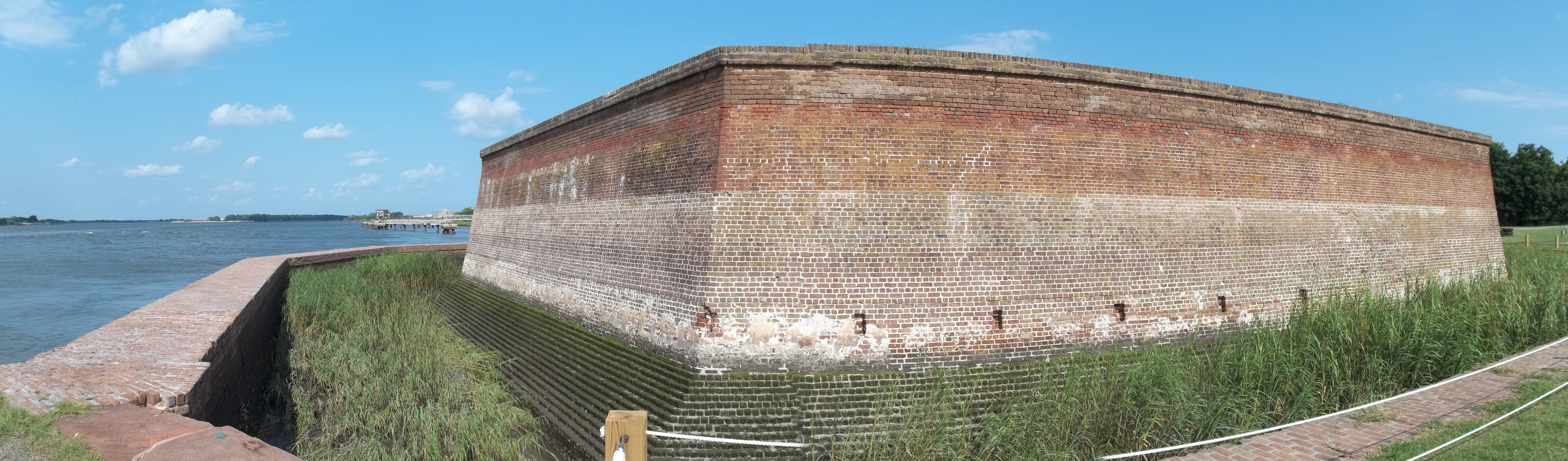
GA Savannah Fort Jackson

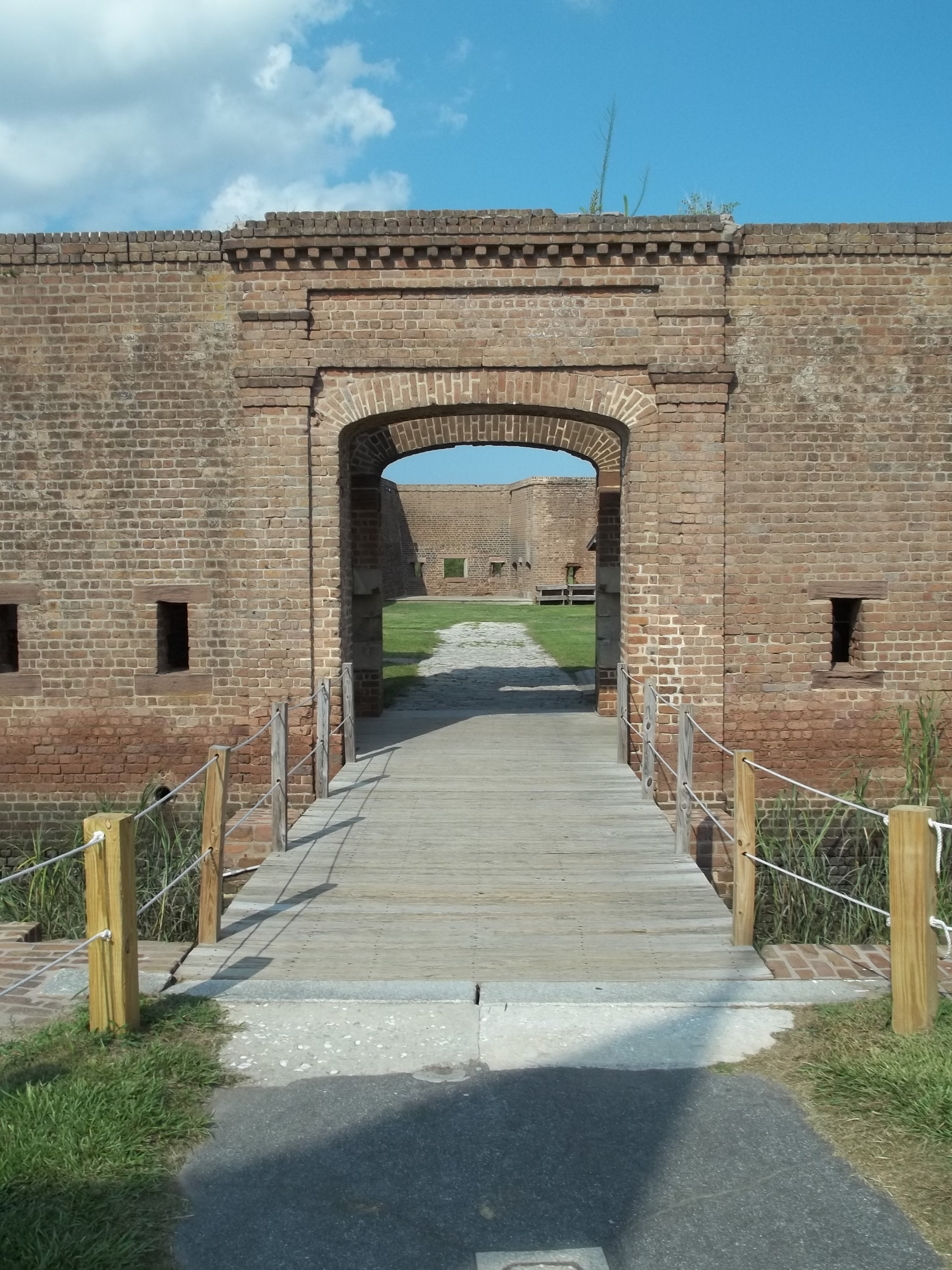
GA Savannah Fort Jackson gate

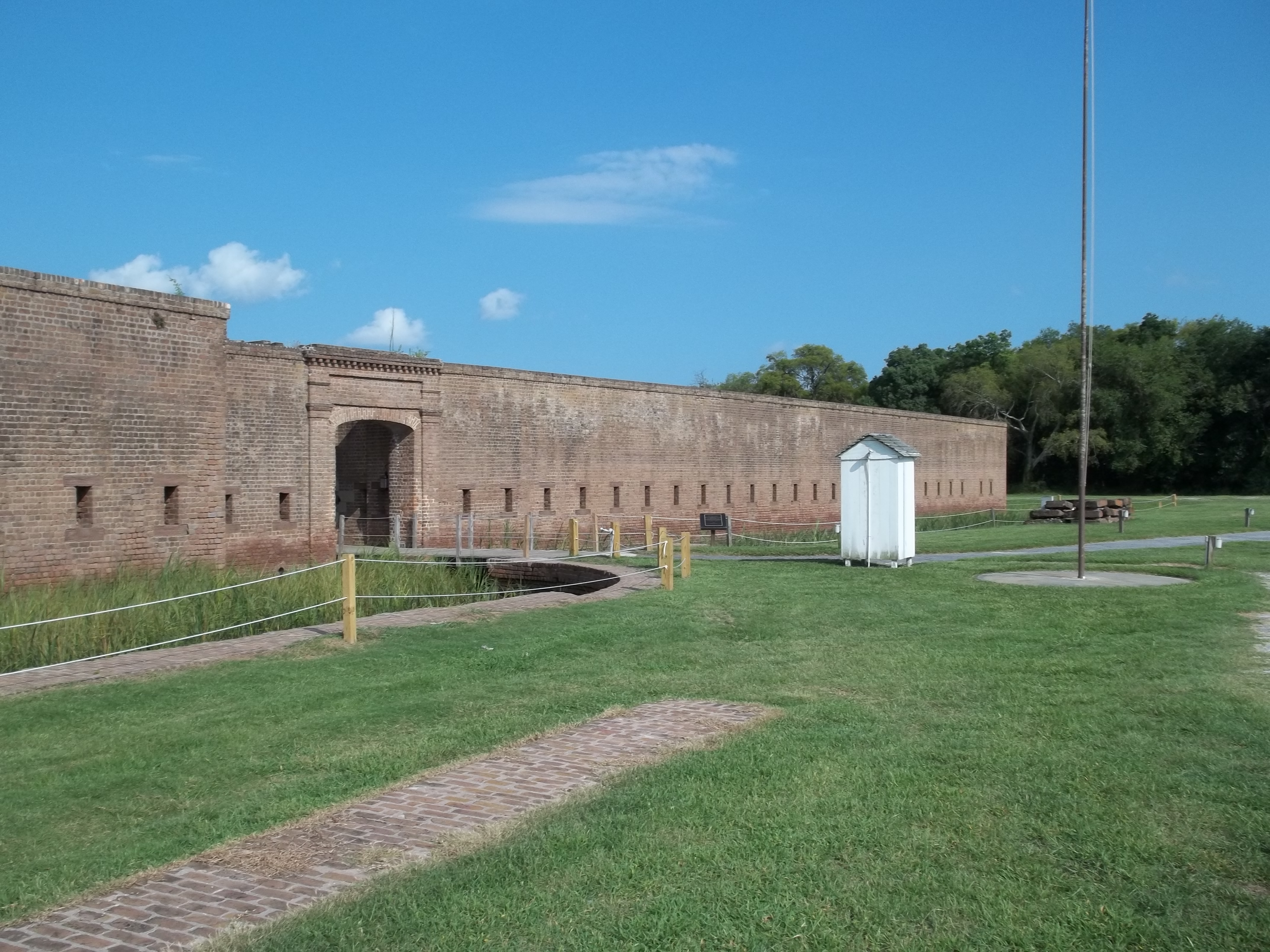
GA Savannah Fort Jackson

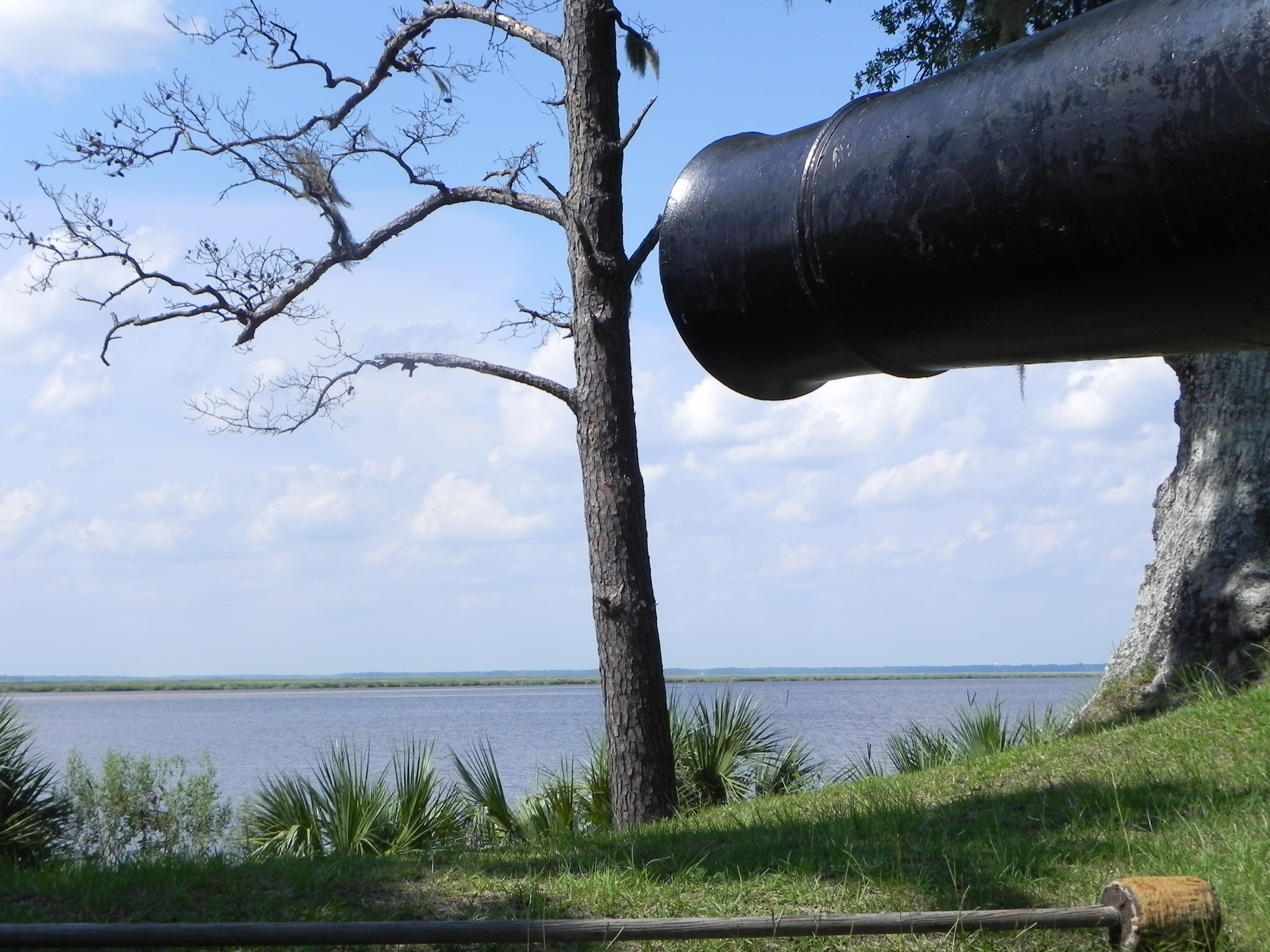
Fort McAllister today

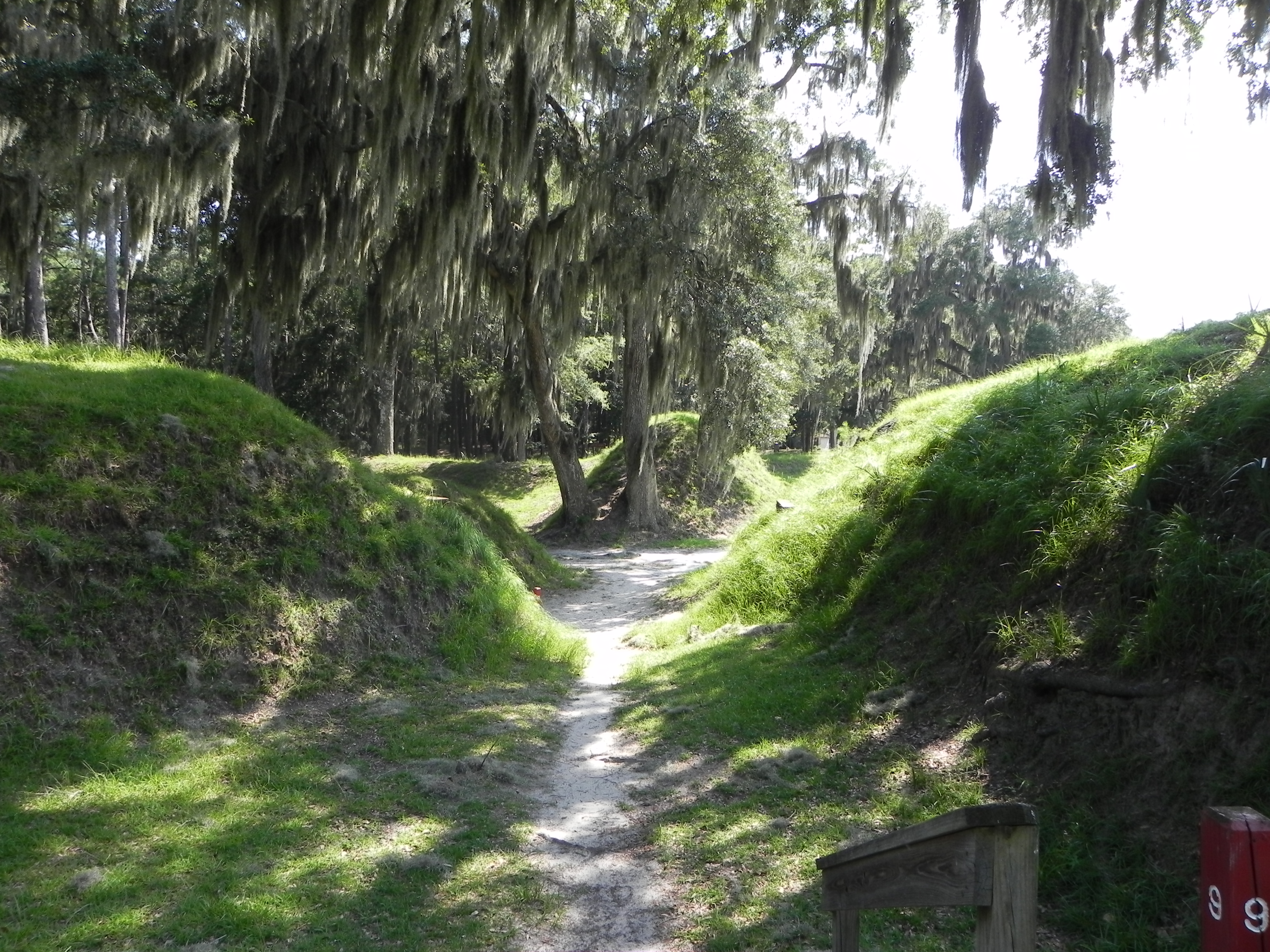
Fort McAllister today

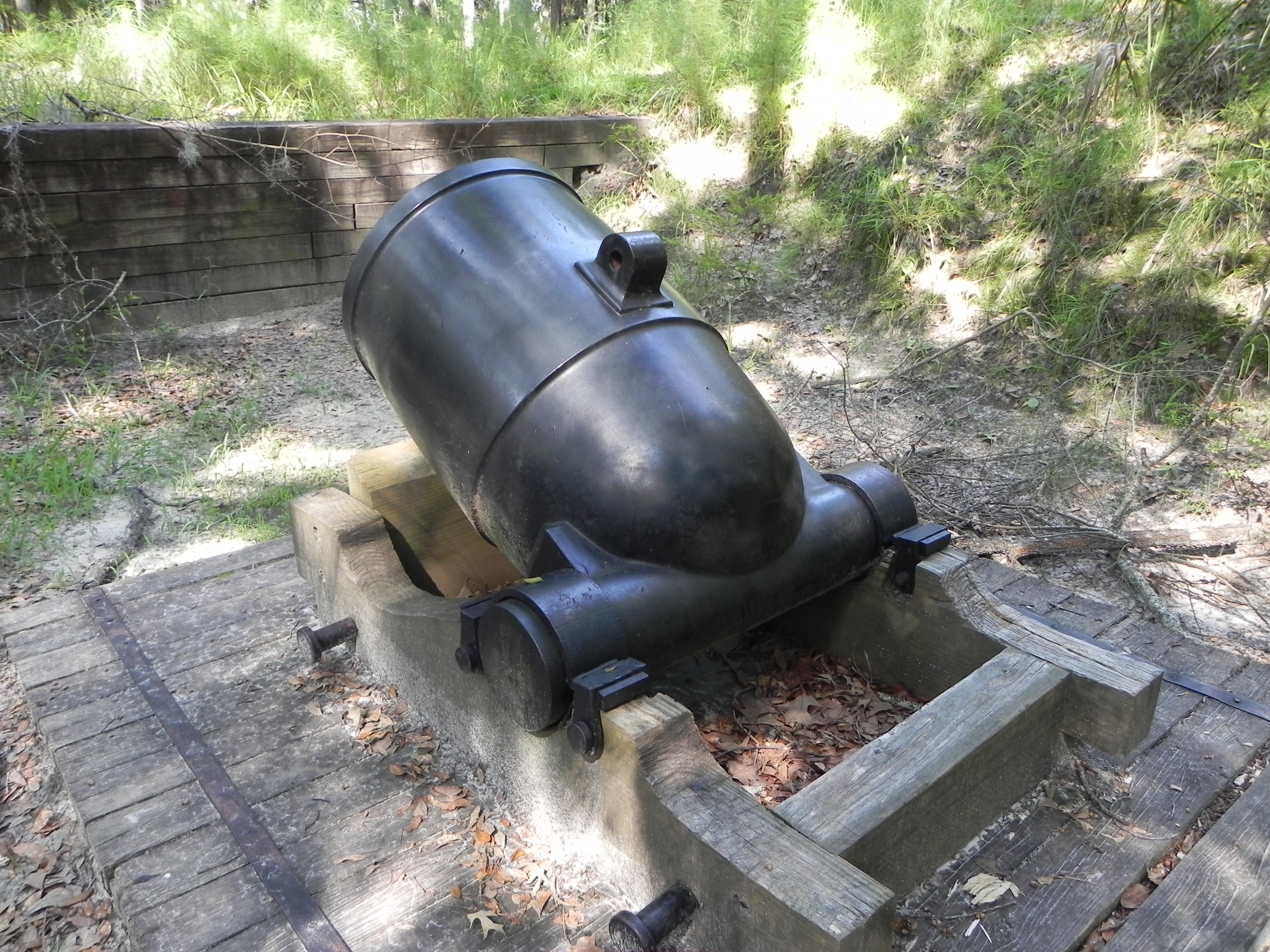
Fort McAllister today

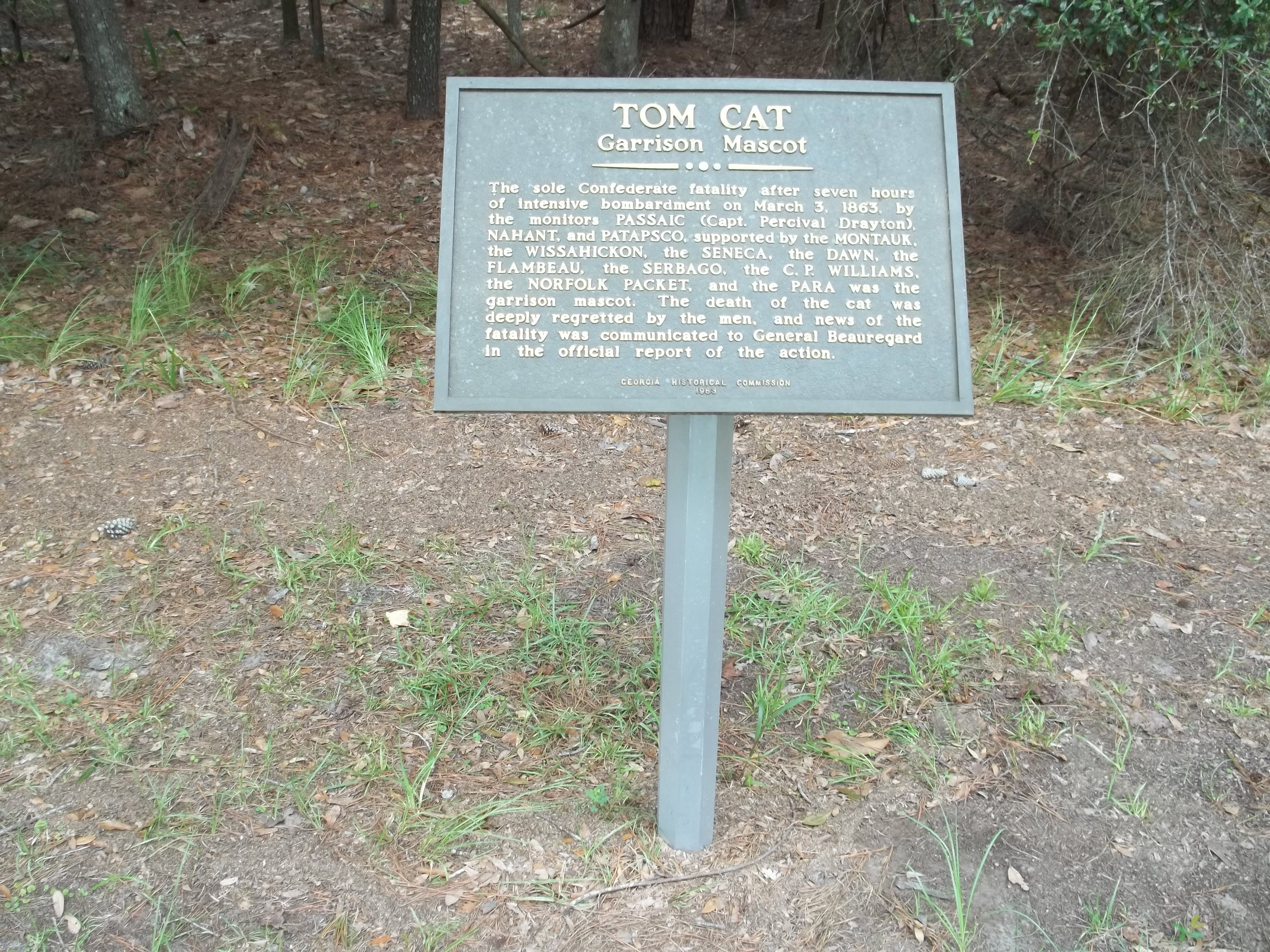
Fort McAllister Tom Cat marker

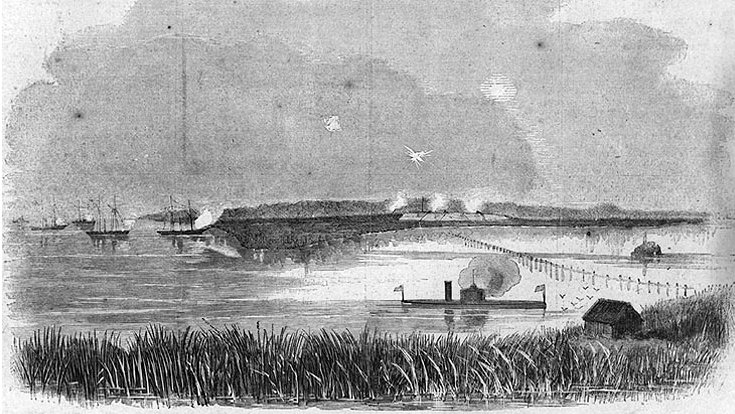
USS Montauk Attacks Fort McAllister

== Other sources ==
- Dixon, William Daniel and Durham, Roger S, The Blues in Gray – The Civil War Journal of William Daniel Dixon and the Republican Blues Daybook, University of Tennessee Press, 2000, ISBN 978-1-5723-3101-3
- Durham, Roger S., Guardian of Savannah – Fort McAllister, Georgia, in the Civil War and Beyond, The University of South Carolina Press, 2008, ISBN 978-1-5700-3742-9
- Christman, William E., UNDAUNTED: The History of Fort McAllister, Georgia, Darien Printing & Graphics, 1996, Library of Congress Catalog 96-77666 ASIN:
- Smith, Derek, Civil War Savannah, Frederic C. Beil, 1997, ISBN 978-1929490004
