= Chatham Artillery punch =

Alcoholic beverage

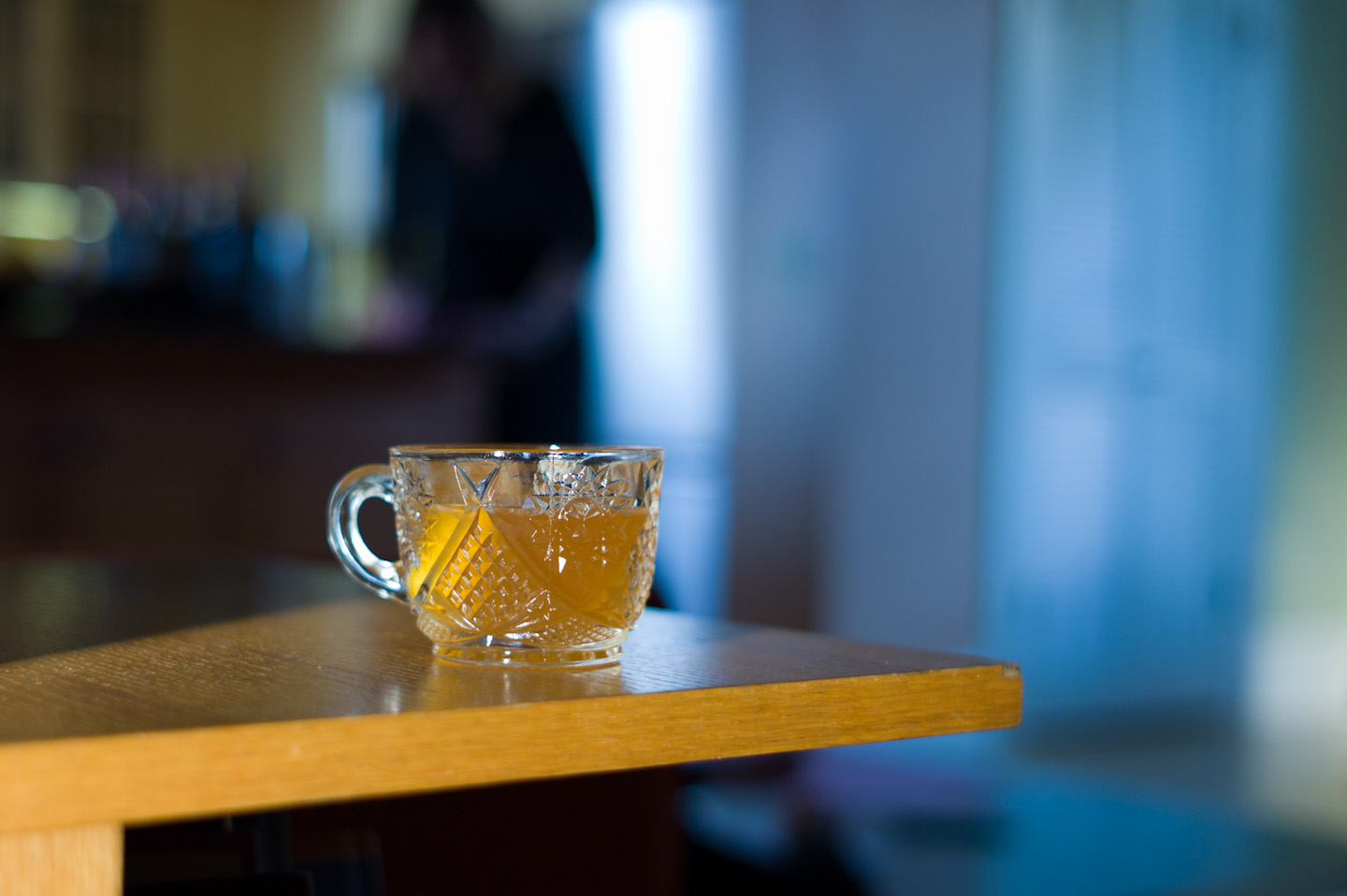
- Type: Mixed drink
- Ingredients: Lemons, sugar, whiskey, brandy, rum, Champagne
- Standard garnish: Grated nutmeg, cherries
- Served: Chilled

Chatham Artillery punch is a potent punch containing rum, whisky, brandy, and Champagne. It also contains lemons and sugar. Named after the Savannah regiment, it is well-known in the city of Savannah, Georgia, which is located in Chatham County.

== History ==
The original recipe and creator are unknown. One legend has it that George Washington was presented the punch when he arrived at Chatham Artillery in 1792, and he gave the regiment two cannons.

A more plausible story was reported in an 1885 article for the Augusta Chronicle. It stated that the punch was created in the 1850s, when the Republican Blues returned from a drill in Macon and were welcomed back by Sergeant A. B. Luce and the Chatham Artillery. The punch was said to have been created by adding a quart of brandy, whiskey, and rum along with Champagne, lemon, and sugar to a horse bucket containing crushed ice. According to this story, every man who drank it was inebriated.

In 1870, a group of Southern journalists held a convention in Savannah and were served the punch on a riverboat cruise. They became inebriated and reported their encounter with the drink, proposing guesses of the actual content. The punch subsequently received national attention. President Chester Arthur was said to have been bested by the drink.

In 1900, Admiral George Dewey, a war hero from the 1898 Battle of Manila Bay, also became inebriated when he imbibed the punch. One recipe was later named after him.

The drink was later revised to become less potent. In a recipe from 1907, it was written: "Experience has taught the rising generation to modify the receipt of their forefathers to conform to the weaker constitutions of their progeny."

After the end of Prohibition in the late 1930s, the cocktail grew in popularity again. One of the last variations was published after Prohibition by the New York Sun in 1939. The new recipes were substantially different, and sometimes included liquors like scotch and gin and even excluded Champagne.

Another legend is that during Sherman's March in the Civil War, the residents of Savannah provided Sherman with so much of the punch that he decided to spare the city.

== Ingredients ==
Many punch recipes call for Santa Cruz rum, which became more popular after Prohibition. It is more likely that heavy, dark rum is more similar to one used in the original recipe. Catawba wine is difficult to find in modern times, and is substituted with a white wine or Champagne. In the 1997 film adaptation of the John Berendt novel Midnight in the Garden of Good and Evil, the punch is referenced as "three parts fruit, seven parts liquor – whatever's available on both counts".

== Preparation ==
The drink can be prepared by taking lemon peels and muddling them with sugar which will extract oils from the lemon peels. This mixture is added to lemon juice and is strained. The lemon-sugar mixture is then added to a large bowl with crushed ice along with brandy, rum, whiskey, and Champagne. Although not likely traditional, candied cherries (and sometimes the juice from the jar) are often added as well. Similarly, gin is sometimes added in modern recipes.

== Variations ==
One variation is called Champagne punch. This is less potent version of the drink, and uses Curaçao or Cointreau, a few shot of bitters, fresh strawberries, lemon, simple syrup, brandy, and Champagne. It is popular at wedding receptions and Christmas parties.

There are similar drinks that exist. One is regent's punch, which is popular along the East Coast of the United States. Another is the Fish house punch, which is found in the Northeast United States.
