= Come and take it =

Slogan used by armies during last stands

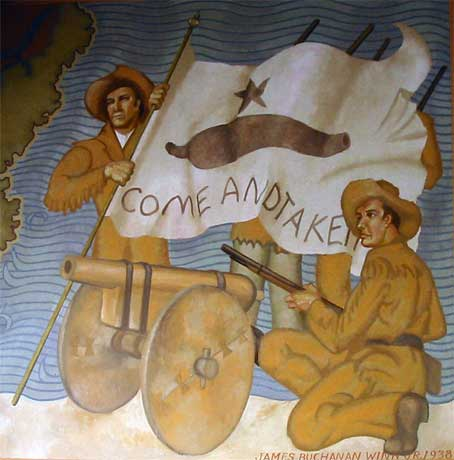
- Detail of a mural in the museum at Gonzales, Texas, featuring a conjectured Come and Take It flag
- Original form: Molṑn labé (ancient Greece)
- Meaning: A refusal against the confiscation of weapons

"Come and take it" is a long-standing expression of defiance first recorded in the ancient Greek form molon labe "come and take [them]", a laconic reply supposedly given by the Spartan King Leonidas I in response to the Persian King Xerxes I's demand for the Spartans to surrender their weapons on the eve of the Battle of Thermopylae in 480 BC. It was later used in 1778 at Fort Morris during the American Revolution, and also in 1835 at the Battle of Gonzales during the Texas Revolution.

== American Revolutionary War ==
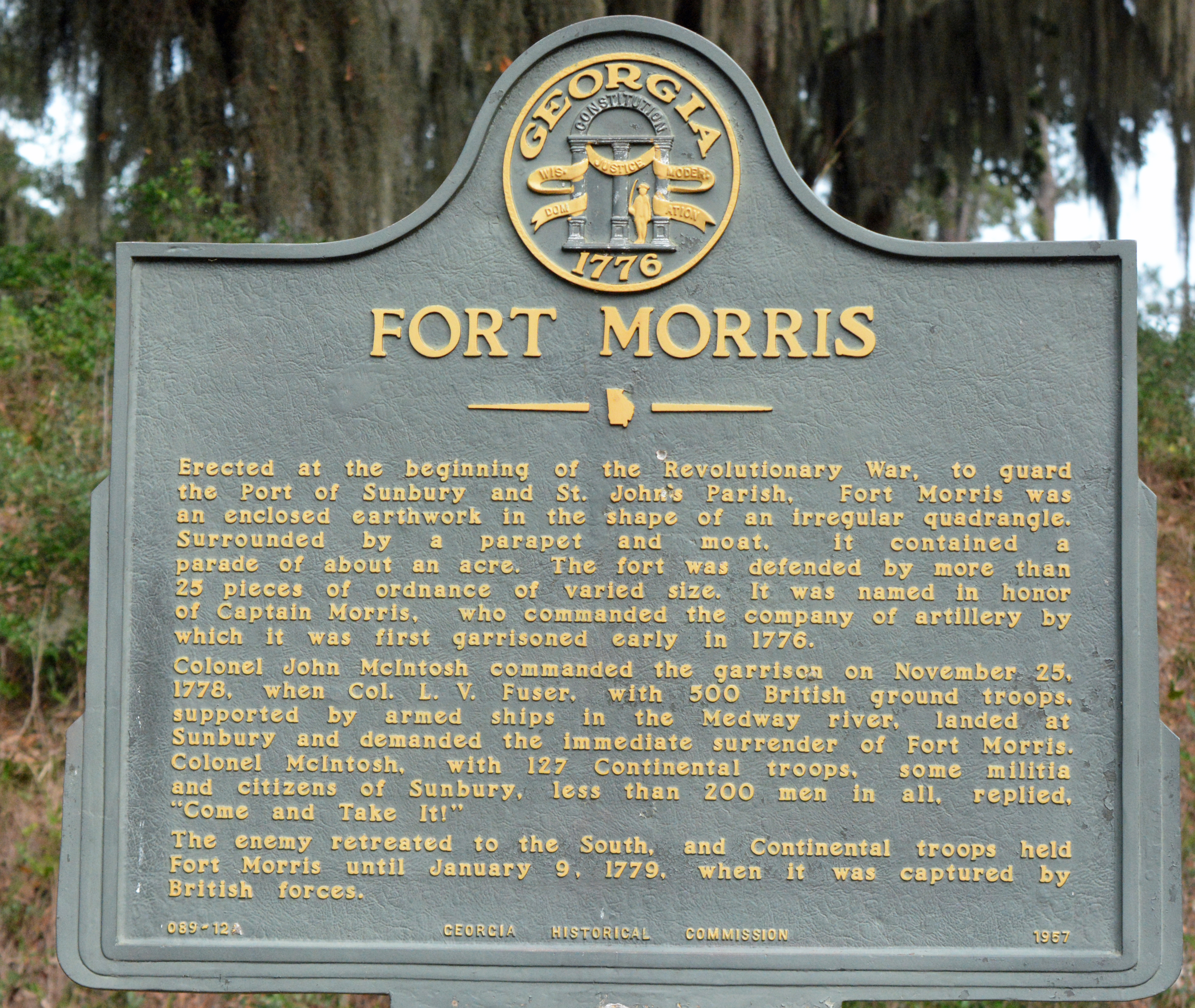
Fort Morris historical marker with "Come and take it!"

Sunbury, Georgia, once an active port, is now a ghost town located east of Hinesville, Georgia. Fort Morris was constructed in Sunbury by the authority of the Continental Congress. A contingent of British soldiers attempted to take the fort on November 25, 1778. The American contingent at Fort Morris was led by Colonel John McIntosh (c. 1748–1826). The Americans numbered only 127 Continental soldiers plus militiamen and local citizens. The fort itself was crudely constructed and could not have withstood any concerted attack.

The British commander, Colonel Fuser, demanded Fort Morris' surrender through a written note to the American rebels. Though clearly outnumbered (he had only about 200 men plus artillery), Colonel McIntosh's defiant written response to the British demand included the following line: "As to surrendering the fort, receive this laconic reply: COME AND TAKE IT!". The British declined to attack, in large part due to their lack of intelligence regarding other forces in the area. Colonel Fuser believed a recent skirmish in the area, combined with Colonel McIntosh's bravado, might have reflected reinforcements and so the British withdrew.

The British returned in January 1779 with a larger force. They later conquered and controlled nearly all of Georgia for the next few years. Colonel McIntosh's defiance inspired other American rebels as the Revolutionary War moved to the Carolinas and then north.

The Fort Morris Historical Marker is on Martin Road, Midway, Georgia. It is located at the visitor center for the Fort Morris Historic Site. The center is located off Fort Morris Road, at the end of the Colonels Island Highway (Georgia Route 38). The marker memorializes the battle and notes the "Come and Take It!" response.

In recognition of his valor in defending Fort Morris, McIntosh was awarded a sword by the Georgia Legislature with the words "Come and Take It" engraved on the blade. McIntosh later served in the War of 1812 as an American General, still protecting the Georgia coast. He served honorably, receiving honors from the City of Savannah for his service.

== Texas Revolution ==
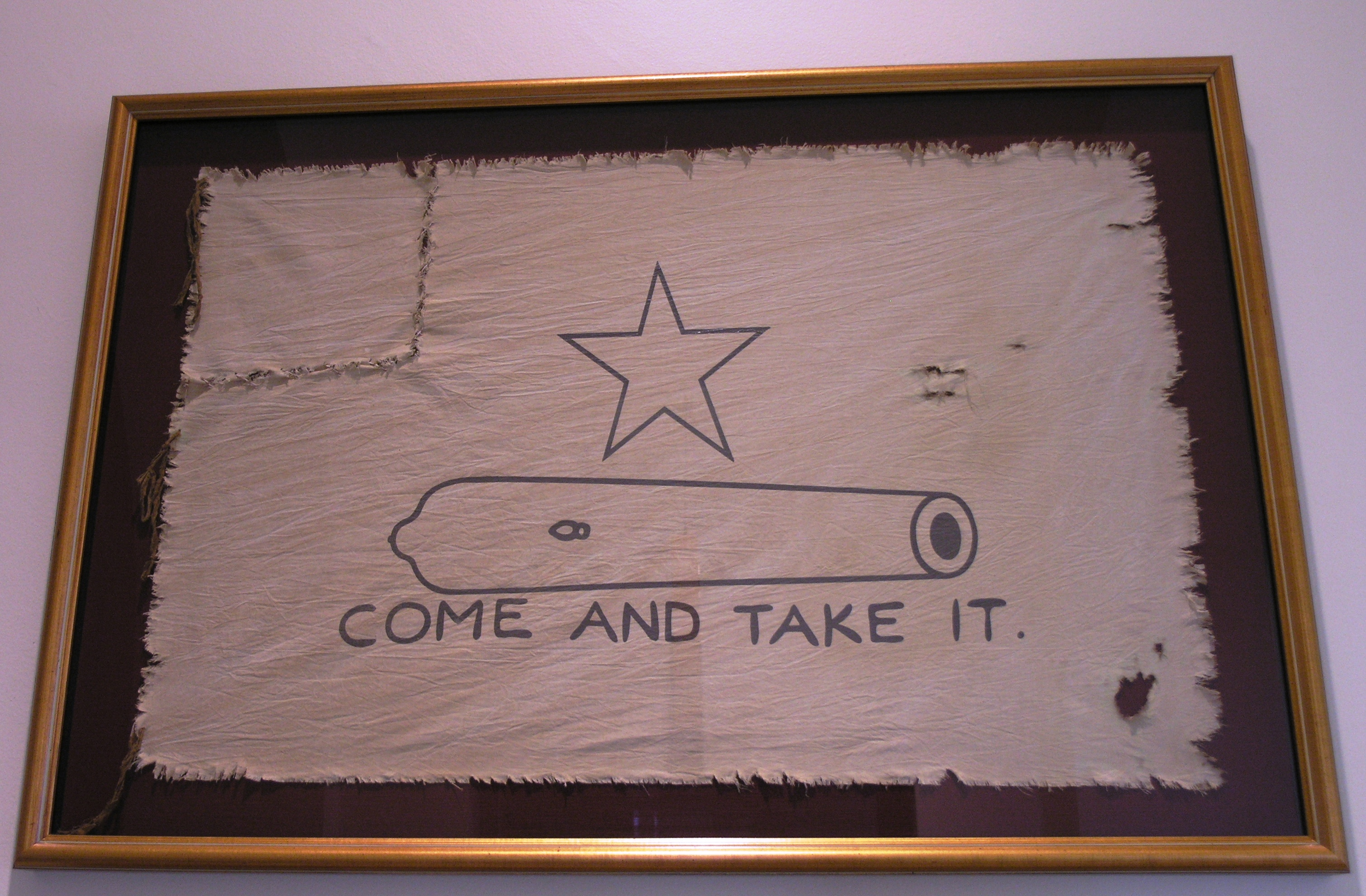
Conjectural replica at the Texas State Capitol showing spiked touch-hole

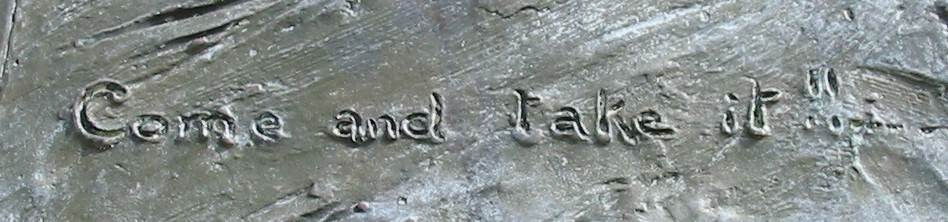
Monument in Gonzales, Texas

In January 1831, Green DeWitt wrote to Ramón Músquiz, the top political official of Bexar, and requested armament for defense of the colony of Gonzales. This request was granted by supplying a Spanish made six-pounder bronze cannon on the condition it be returned when asked for, the colony also having a much smaller cast iron cannon of around one pounder calibre. James Tumlinson, Jr. signed for receipt of the six-pounder cannon on March 10, 1831, in Bexar.

At the minor skirmish in 1835 known as the Battle of Gonzales—the first land battle of the Texas Revolution against Mexico—a small group of Texians successfully resisted the Mexican forces who had orders from Colonel Domingo de Ugartechea to seize the loaned cannon after the Texians had refused to return it when asked.

As a symbol of defiance, Caroline Zumwalt and Eveline DeWitt, a young woman from Gonzales, made a flag with the phrase "come and take it" (Spanish: Ven y tómalo) either printed above or below the cannon that they had been loaned four years earlier by Mexican officials. This was the same message that was sent to the Mexican government when they told the Texians to return the cannon in compliance with the loan condition; the Texian refusal to do so led to the Mexican attempt to regain the cannon using military force.

The original flag was lost shortly after the battle. Conjectural replicas of the original flag can be seen in the Texas State Capitol, the Bob Bullock Texas State History Museum, the Sam Houston State University CJ Center, the University of Texas at El Paso Library, the Marine Military Academy headquarters building, the Hockaday School Hoblitzelle Auditorium, and in Perkins Library at Duke University.

== American Civil War ==
On October 12, 1864, during the Franklin–Nashville campaign, Confederate general J. B. Hood wrote to the Union commander at Resaca, Georgia, demanding an "immediate and unconditional surrender". That officer, Col. Clark R. Weaver, declined the request and concluded his letter of reply, "In my opinion, I can hold this post. If you want it, come and take it".

Richard W. Dowling's tactical brilliance and leadership at Sabine Pass earned him a lasting place in Confederate history. The term "Thermopylae of the Confederacy" underscores the extraordinary odds his unit faced and the strategic significance of his victory, which safeguarded Texas from Union invasion. The similar motto echoes in Gonzales.

== Adapted uses ==
Come and Take It flag

Adapted version with folder icon created by Defense Distributed

Modern M16 rifle variant

The first-known modified version, from the 1990s, replaces the cannon with an M16 rifle and was displayed at a Bill of Rights rally in Arizona following the announcement by President George H. W. Bush that certain types of firearms and firearms parts would be banned. It was shown at a number of later rallies and campaign events through the late 1990s, and now resides in a private collection.

In 2002, a version of the flag was created which depicted a Barrett .50 BMG Rifle. Other versions have depicted various firearms, and even other objects dear to the hearts of the flag makers. During the 2000 Stanley Cup Finals at least one Dallas Stars fan had created a replica of the flag with the Stanley Cup replacing the cannon; the Stars were the defending champions that year.

Since 2018 a popular version used by the 3D2A movement replaces the cannon with a file folder, playing on the meaning of "take" in the Internet era.

In 2026 Massachusetts Governor Maura Healey issued a challenge to HHS Secretary Robert F. Kennedy, Jr. over social media platform X, replacing the Texas cannon with a Dunkin' Donuts iced coffee cup, after Secretary Kennedy called into question whether Dunkin' Donuts and Starbucks products were safe for teenagers to consume.

== See also ==
- "Don't Tread on Me", slogan used on the Gadsden flag
- "From my cold, dead hands", slogan popularised by American organisations opposed to gun control
- "La garde meurt mais ne se rend pas" and "Merde!" ("shit", figuratively "go to hell"), historic response of French General Pierre Cambronne to a request to surrender at the Battle of Waterloo (1815)
- "NUTS!", historic response to an offer of surrender from Nazi Germany at the Siege of Bastogne (1944)
- Reply of the Zaporozhian Cossacks, a painting by Ilya Repin depicting the legend of a defiant Cossack response to an Ottoman ultimatum
- "Je vous répondrai par la bouche de mes canons!" ("I will answer you with the mouths of my cannons"), shortened version of Frontenac's historic response at the Battle of Quebec (1690)
- "They shall not pass", historic phrase of military defiance from many encounters
- "Russian warship, go fuck yourself", response, during the 2022 Russian invasion of Ukraine, by a Ukrainian border guard on Snake Island to demands from the Russian warship Moskva to surrender
