= Fort Morris (disambiguation) =

Fort Morris may refer to:

- Fort Morris, an earthen works fort in Liberty County, Georgia
- Fort Morris Historic Site, a Georgia state historic park in Liberty County, Georgia
- Fort Morris (Pennsylvania), stockade built during the French and Indian War, in Cumberland County, Pennsylvania
- Fort Morris (Nova Scotia), an 18th-century British blockhouse located in Liverpool, Nova Scotia
