= Sunbury, Georgia =

- Ghost town
- Location within Georgia Location within the United States
- Coordinates: 31°46′5″N 81°16′50″W
- Country: United States
- State: Georgia
- County: Liberty
- Elevation: 20 ft (6 m)
- Time zone: UTC-5 (Eastern (EST))
  - Summer (DST): UTC-4 (EDT)

Sunbury is a ghost town in Liberty County, Georgia. Established in 1758, the town was mostly abandoned by the mid-1800s.

The town is located on the south bank of the Medway River, in an area that was first settled by Europeans in the 1750s. The town was established in 1758 and quickly became an important seaport for the Province of Georgia after becoming a port of entry in the 1760s, rivaling the nearby port city of Savannah. During the American Revolutionary War, the town was defended by American troops stationed at Fort Morris. However, the town and fort were captured by the British in 1779, who burned the town near the war's end. Following the war, the town was economically devastated and struggled to recover. In the 1790s, the town lost its status as county seat and was later affected by an outbreak of yellow fever and two damaging hurricanes. What remained of the town in the mid-1800s was destroyed in 1864 as part of Sherman's March to the Sea during the American Civil War.

== History ==
=== Early history ===
The area that would become the town of Sunbury was first settled by Europeans in 1752 by the families of Benjamin and Samuel Baker, from the British Province of South Carolina. The site was on the south bank of the Midway River, (Note: Also spelled Medway River.) in what was at the time the Province of Georgia, on a bluff several miles upriver from St. Catherine's Sound. In 1757, 500 acres (200 ha) of this area was conveyed by King George II of Great Britain to Mark Carr, a wealthy military officer. Carr sold some land lots to other people, and soon several wharves on the river and a trading post were established.

=== Establishment of the town ===
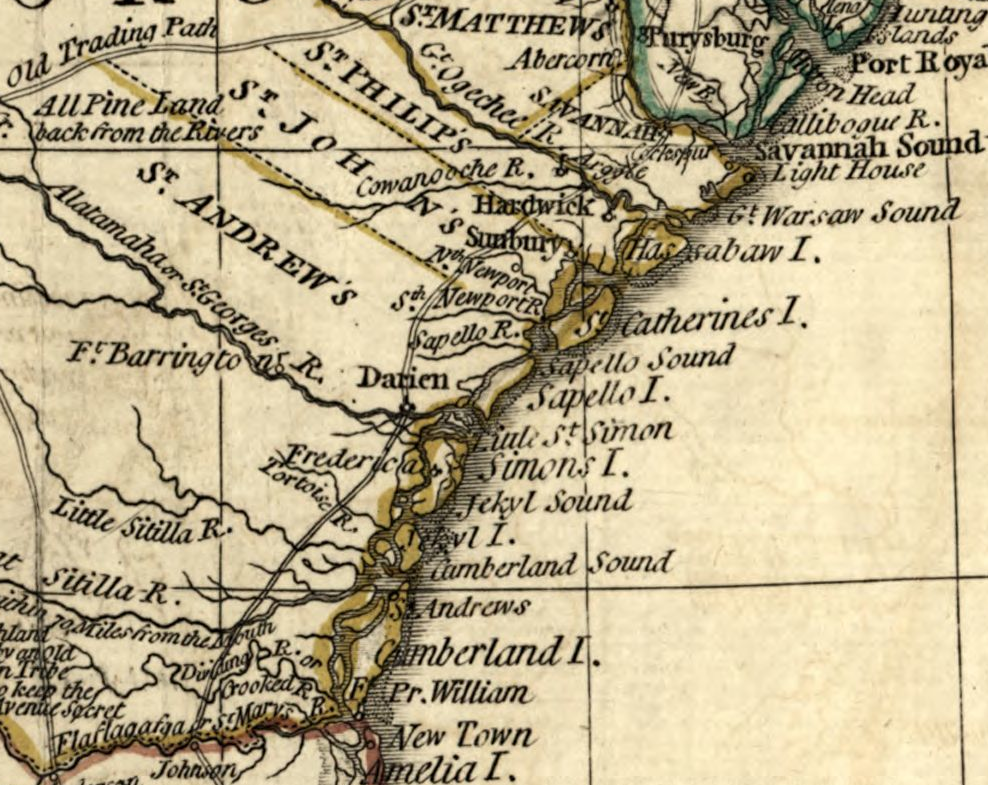
1776 map of coastal Georgia showing Sunbury and Saint John's Parish

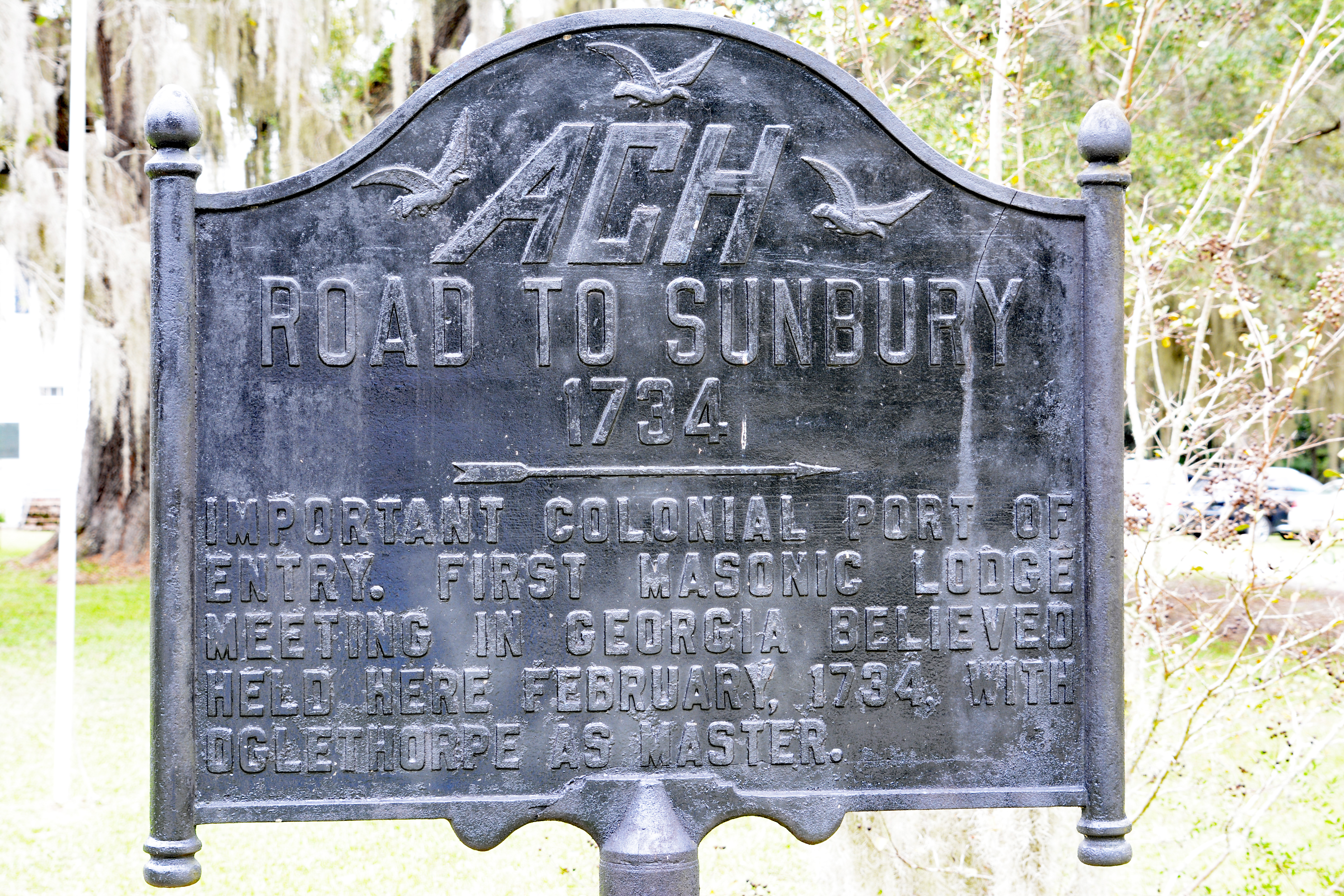
Sign in Darien, Georgia for the road to Sunbury

On June 20, 1758, Mark Carr and several other men from the area agreed to establish a town on Carr's land. (Note: Sources vary on how many men were involved in the establishment of the town. A 2007 article from the Coastal Courier states that, "Carr entered into an agreement with five men to establish a town". However, a 1918 publication in The Georgia Historical Quarterly lists four men aside from Carr who were involved in the town's establishment: Kenneth Baillie, John Elliott, James Maxwell, and John Stevens.) Carr oversaw much of the planning for this new town, including the town's layout, the architectural style that would be used for the buildings, and the cost for each land lot. Each of the 496 lots would measure 70 feet (21 m) by 130 feet (40 m) and would surround three town squares, similar in layout to Savannah, Georgia, which had a unique system of squares. These three squares were named King's Square, Meeting Square, and Church Square. Additionally, buildings built in the town were constructed from wood and tabby concrete. At the time, it was the first and only town in Saint John's Parish, which consisted of all of present-day Liberty County, Georgia. The parish contained one other settlement within its boundaries, Midway, which had been founded by New England Puritans around 1752. Prior to their move to Georgia, these Congregationalists had lived in Dorchester, South Carolina. Within several years of their settlement, they were having a sizeable impact on the economy of Georgia, primarily farming rice.

The new town was named Sunbury, most likely after Carr's ancestral English home of Sunbury-on-Thames. Variant names for the town included "Sunbery" and "Sunbury Landing", and the harbor that separated Sunbury from a nearby small island was known as the Sunbury Channel. Additionally, a small tidal stream located several miles from the settlement is known as Sunbury Creek.

Around the time of its establishment, the town had five wharves operated by local merchant companies, which purchased goods from Savannah and transported them to the town via sloops. In 1761, (Note: The year is given as 1761 in several sources, but one gives the year as 1762.) the town became Georgia's second port of entry and quickly rose in prominence, soon rivalling Savannah in terms of economic importance. Discussing the town in a 1763 letter to Lord Halifax, James Wright, the governor of Georgia, wrote the following:

I judged it necessary for his Majesty's service that Sunbury, a well settled place having an exceedingly good harbor and inlet from the sea, should be made a port of entry; and have appointed Thomas Carr collector and John Martin naval officer for the same. There are 80 dwelling houses in the place. There are considerable merchant stores for supplying the town and the planters in the neighborhood with all kind of necessary goods; and around it, for about 15 miles, is one of the best settled parts of the country.

The town had a shipyard, a manufacturing center that produced shingles and staves, and a causeway connecting it to nearby Colonels Island, which served as an important center for Indigo dye production in the region before the market crashed in 1808. This causeway was repaired annually in the fall by slaves who had been requisitioned by the local government. Additionally, the town and island had a sizeable lumber industry, exporting wood to other ports throughout the West Indies. The area attracted a large number of immigrants, including a sizeable number of people from Bermuda. At one point, a canal was considered that would have connected the Midway River and Newport River through the area separating Colonels Island from the mainland in order to make it easier for plantations in the area to transport their rice crops to Sunbury. However, this never came to fruition, and instead planters further inland created a plan to bridge the Newport River near its source in order to directly transport their rice yields to Savannah. While Sunbury was opposed to this plan, fearing it would hurt their port's economy, the bridge was constructed, with a settlement emerging around the bridge known as Riceboro. In 1772, 56 ships were recorded as having accessed the port, and on at least one occasion, slaves from Africa were brought and sold at one of the wharves. Many planters who owned plantations in the area had houses in Sunbury in which they lived during the summer and fall seasons, typically arriving in June and leaving in November. In 1773, the naturalist William Bartram wrote about a visit he had to the town, describing it as "beautifully situated on the main" with a "capacious and safe" harbor that had "water enough for ships of great burthen".

=== American Revolution ===
The town of Sunbury was a hotbed of pro-American sentiment in Georgia during the American Revolution. Lyman Hall, a future signer of the United States Declaration of Independence and governor of Georgia, lived in Sunbury, while Button Gwinnett, another signer, conducted his business in the town as Saint John's Parish's justice. Gwinnett also owned a large plantation on the nearby St. Catherine's Island. In June 1775, British customs officers seized a ship in Sunbury's port that was carrying illegal cargo, but the ship was freed after a group of local people met at the town's liberty pole and intimidated the officials.

The town was protected by the nearby Fort Morris, which had been constructed in 1756 to protect the European settlers from Creek Indians. During the American Revolutionary War, Colonel John McIntosh replied to a British order to surrender the fort with the slogan, "Come and take it". However, in 1779, the fort and town were both captured by British forces, who maintained control over the surrounding area for the duration of the war. The fort was one of the last strongholds against the British during the war, which the British later renamed Fort George and, later, Fort Defense. During this occupation, George Walton, another signer of the Declaration of Independence, was held as a prisoner of war before eventually being paroled. Around 1781, the town had about 1,000 residents and numerous businesses occupying 300 acres (120 ha) next to the river. However, during the British evacuation near the war's conclusion, the town and the fort were both burned by the troops.

=== Post-Revolution and War of 1812 ===
Following the war, in 1784, Sunbury became the first county seat for Liberty County. In February 1788, the Sunbury Academy was authorized and established several years later in 1793. The school, located in King's Square, operated for about the next 40 years and was considered one of the most famous schools in the southern part of the state. It was headed by The Reverend Dr. William McWhir, who was a friend of George Washington. The town was officially incorporated on December 8, 1791, during a time when other cities in Georgia, such as Augusta and Brunswick were also gaining self-government. In 1792, Sunbury Road was laid out, which made it easier for farmers in the area to transport their crops to the port. The road connected Sunbury to Greensboro, Georgia, and was the longest vehicular route established in the state following the Revolutionary War. In 1793, a post office was established in the town. However, in the late 1790s, the county seat was transferred to Riceboro. (Note: Sources vary on when the county seat was transferred to Riceboro, with both a 2007 article in the Coastal Courier and a 1918 article in The Georgia Historical Quarterly giving the year as 1797, while the New Georgia Encyclopedia gives the year as 1798.) In 1804, the town was hit by a strong hurricane, and by the early 1800s, it had lost much of its trade to Savannah.

During the War of 1812, British warships were stationed off of the coast of Georgia, which disrupted trade and hurt the economies of port cities such as Sunbury. To combat this, the United States Navy launched a naval expedition to Sunbury, with the plan to use the port's deep harbor as a staging area for gunboats that would patrol the Intracoastal Waterway. However, this plan ended in failure due to logistical issues and a lack of resources. As a result of this failure, the state decided to instead reinforce its existing coastal fortifications, including Fort Morris, which was rebuilt with the new name of Fort Defiance. This construction was performed in mid-1813. By the end of the war in 1815, the town, like several other coastal settlements in the state, had suffered a significant economic decline due to the blockade.

=== Later history ===
The town's destruction by the British seriously damaged its economic importance, as it left the town in ruins and impoverished. The town was later affected by an outbreak of yellow fever and hit by two major hurricanes, which further exacerbated its decline. On December 8, 1841, the town's post office ceased operations, and by 1848, the town was more-or-less abandoned. What remained of the town was ultimately destroyed in 1864 during the American Civil War as part of Sherman's March to the Sea, arriving in the area that December. Today, the Sunbury Cemetery is one of the only remaining structures from the town's history. In 1957, the Georgia Historical Commission erected a Georgia historical marker for "Sunbury and Fort Morris" about 11 miles (18 km) west of the ghost town in Midway.

== Notable people ==
- James Hamilton Couper, planter and slaver (d. 1866)
- John Jones, major (1749–1779)
- Maria Jane McIntosh, writer (d. 1878)
- John Elliott Ward, politician and diplomat (d. 1902)

== See also ==
- List of ghost towns in Georgia (U.S. state)

== Sources ==
- Clarke, Erskine (2005). Dwelling Place: A Plantation Epic. New Haven, Connecticut: Yale University Press. ISBN 978-0-300-10867-5.
- Coleman, Kenneth (1978). Georgia History in Outline (3rd ed.). Athens, Georgia: University of Georgia Press. ISBN 978-0-8203-0467-0.
- Coleman, Kenneth, ed. (1991). A History of Georgia (2nd ed.). Athens, Georgia: University of Georgia Press. ISBN 978-0-8203-1269-9.
- "Sunbury". Geographic Names Information System. United States Geological Survey. Archived from the original on November 14, 2021.
- "Sunbury And Fort Morris". Georgia Historical Society. November 20, 2015. Archived from the original on April 7, 2022.
- Krakow, Kenneth K. (1999). Georgia Place-Names: Their History and Origins (3rd ed.). Macon, Georgia: Winship Press. ISBN 0-915430-00-2.
- "Sunbury Cemetery". Liberty County. January 27, 2014. Archived from the original on January 17, 2021.
- Love, Margie (October 16, 2007) [October 1, 2007]. "Sunbury: A once-thriving seaport". Coastal Courier. Archived from the original on April 7, 2022.
- Mallard, John B. (March 1918). "Liberty County, Georgia: An Address Delivered at Hinesville, July 4, 1876". The Georgia Historical Quarterly. II (1). Georgia Historical Society: 1–21.
- Smith, George Gillman (1900). The Story of Georgia and the Georgia People, 1732 to 1860. Atlanta: The Franklin Printing and Publishing Co. ISBN 978-0-598-90282-5.
- Smith, Gerald Judson (September 25, 2014) [August 28, 2002]. "War of 1812 and Georgia". New Georgia Encyclopedia. Archived from the original on March 19, 2022.
- Walker, Winston E. (August 2, 2018) [July 20, 2004]. "Liberty County". New Georgia Encyclopedia. Archived from the original on December 17, 2021.
