= Sunbury Cemetery =

Cemetery in Georgia, United States

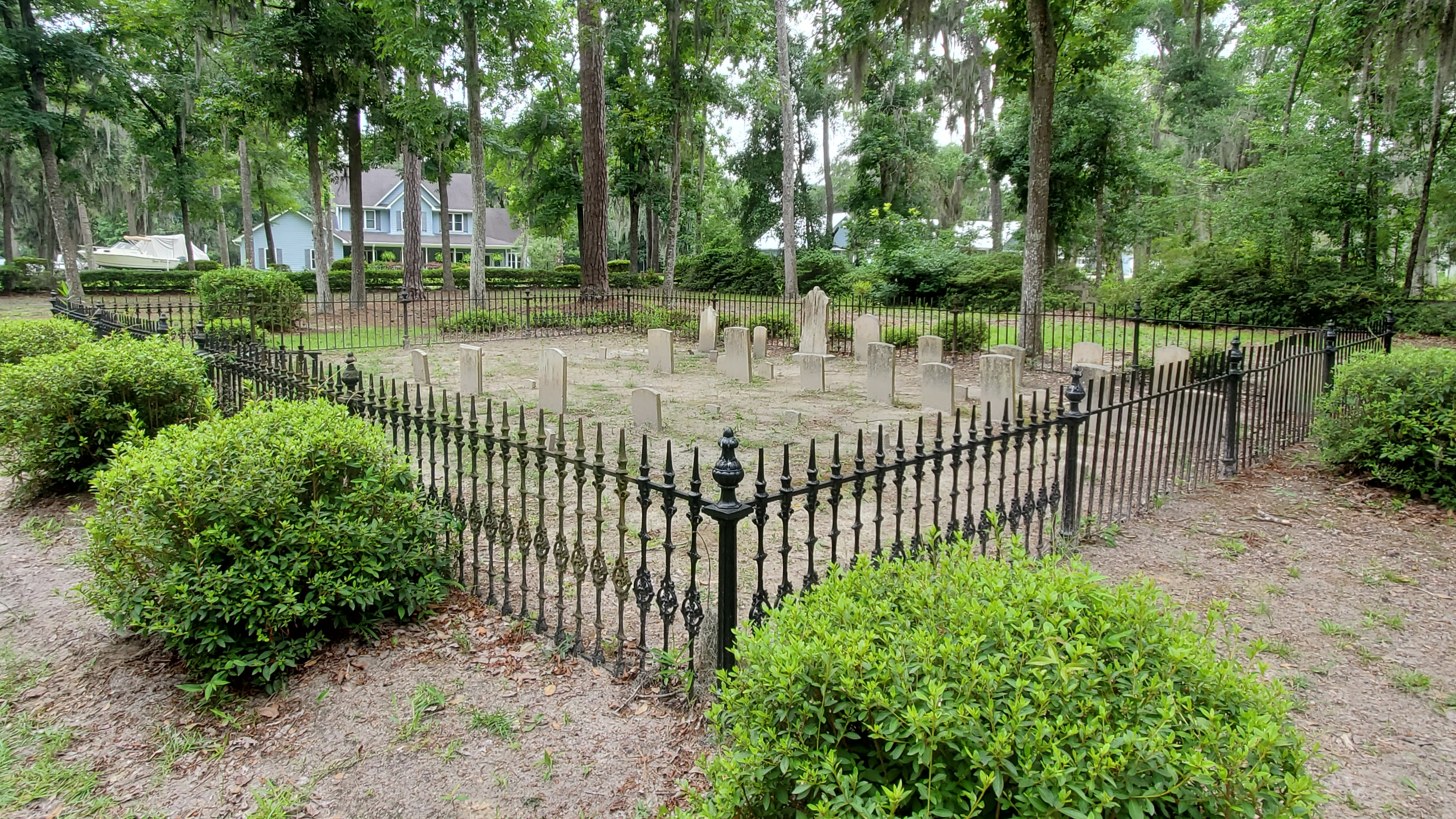
- The cemetery in 2021
- Interactive map of Sunbury Cemetery

Details
- Location: Sunbury, Georgia, United States
- Coordinates: 31°46′12″N 81°17′1″W
- Type: Historic
- No. of graves: 34

Sunbury Cemetery is a historic cemetery located in Sunbury, Georgia, United States.

== History ==
The town of Sunbury was an active seaport in the Province of Georgia in the years prior to the American Revolution. In 1773, Sunbury saw 56 vessels enter port, compared to the larger port city of Savannah's 160. During the American Revolutionary War, Fort Morris was constructed to defend Sunbury, but in 1779, the fort was overtaken by British troops and the town was burned. Following its destruction and the subsequent growth of Savannah, the town entered into a period of decline and was abandoned by 1860. The cemetery for the town was located in the southwest corner of Church Square and was the place of most of the burials in the area prior to the American Civil War. While the cemetery is home to some burials from the Revolutionary and colonial era, many of the tombstones were destroyed by the 1870s. Of the 34 markers that remain in the cemetery, the oldest dates to 1788 while the most recent dates to 1911. The cemetery is one of the only remaining structures from Sunbury.

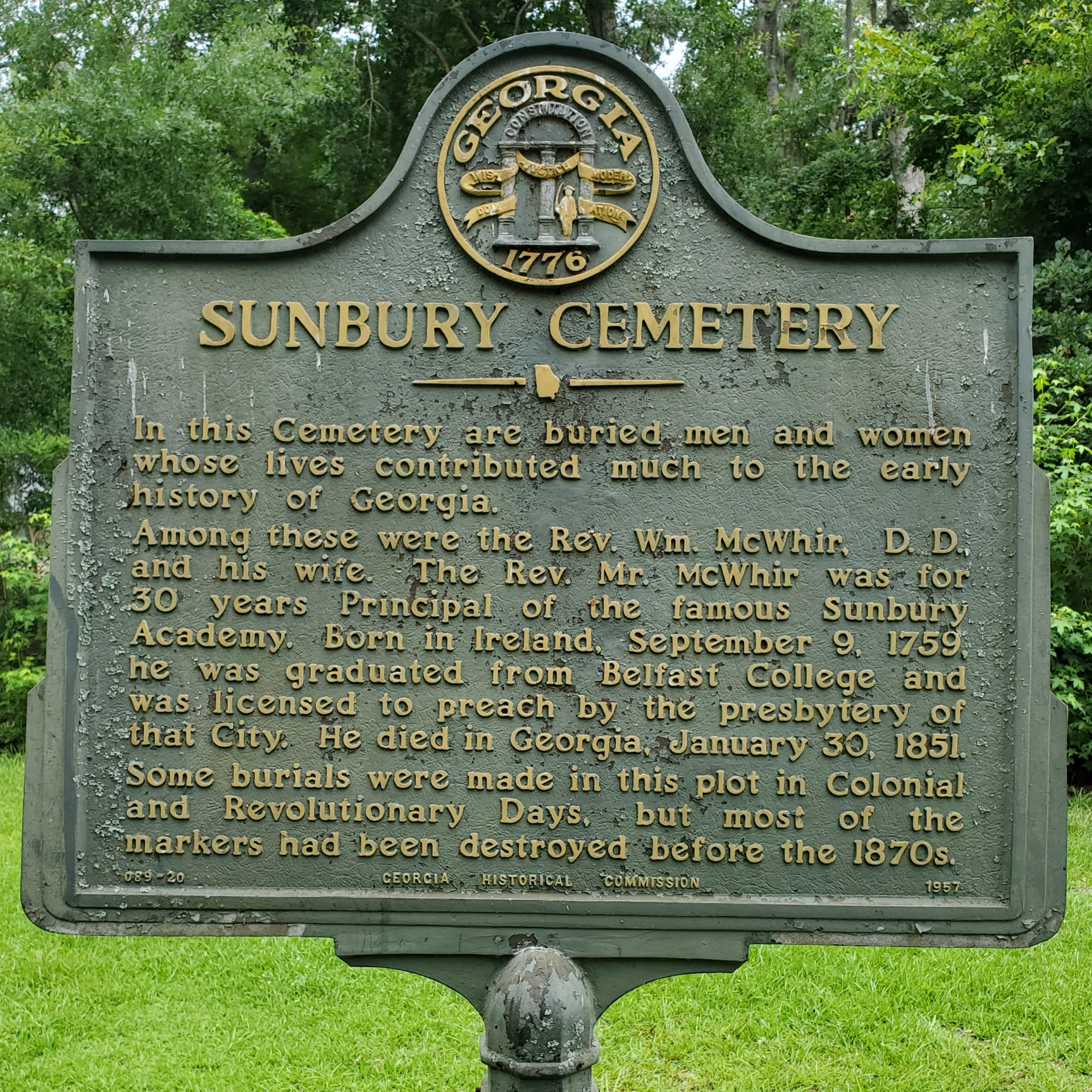
Georgia Historical Marker for the cemetery

In 1957, the Georgia Historical Commission erected a Georgia Historical Marker at the site.

== See also ==
- Charles Odingsell Screven, buried in the cemetery
