= From my cold, dead hands =

Slogan used by US gun rights activists

"I'll give you my gun when you pry (or take) it from my cold, dead hands" is a slogan popularized by American organizations opposed to gun control. A form of the slogan is attested from the 1970s when it was promoted by the Citizens Committee for the Right to Keep and Bear Arms. It gained widespread popularity following the May 2000 National Rifle Association convention when actor and then-president of the NRA, Charlton Heston, used the phrase to conclude a speech. Though the slogan has often been used by gun owners and their supporters, it has also been frequently satirised and parodied in the media and by supporters of greater gun control in the United States.

== Origin ==
A form of the slogan has existed since at least the mid 1970s. It is referred to in a 1975 article by Larry Wilensky for the St. Louis Post-Dispatch newspaper; the article was subsequently reproduced in a 1976 report on gun control from the Senate Judiciary Committee Subcommittee to Investigate Juvenile Delinquency. Wilensky reports that the bumper stickers were at that time sold reading "I Will Give Up My Gun When They Peel My Cold Dead Fingers From Around It." The stickers were sold by the Citizens Committee for to Right to Keep and Bear Arms, today the advocacy arm of the Second Amendment Foundation.

John Wayne paraphrased the slogan in a July 19, 1976, interview with Boxoffice:

When asked if he was prepared to give up his guns, Wayne replied: "I have a sign on my car that reads: 'They can have my guns when they can pry them loose from my cold dead fingers.'"

== Use by Charlton Heston ==
The phrase gained newfound popularity following the 129th NRA convention, in Charlotte, North Carolina on May 20, 2000, when actor and then-president of the NRA, Charlton Heston, ended a speech by concluding:

When ordinary hands can possess such an extraordinary instrument, that symbolizes the full measure of human dignity and liberty. That's why those five words issue an irresistible call to us all, and we muster.

Heston then paused to pick up a replica of a flintlock long rifle and continued:

So, as we set out this year to defeat the divisive forces that would take freedom away, I want to say those fighting words for everyone within the sound of my voice to hear and to heed, and especially for you, Mr. Gore: 'From my cold, dead hands!'

— Charlton Heston, May 20, 2000

== Use in American politics ==
The phrase has been used by numerous Second Amendment rights groups including The National Rifle Association, National Association for Gun Rights. The term also lends itself to the Second Amendment for-profit business Cold Dead Hands.

== Media appearances ==
In the 1984 film Red Dawn, Soviet paratroopers invade the middle United States. A bumper sticker with the statement on it is shown, and then the camera pans to an M1911A1 pistol clutched in its dead owner's hand. One of the paratroopers literally takes the gun from his dead hands, shoves it in his own belt, and then leaves.

In the 1997 film Men in Black, a farmer named Edgar threatens a recently landed evil alien with a shotgun. Told to place the projectile weapon on the ground, Edgar says, "You can have my gun when you pry it from my cold, dead fingers." The alien responds, "Your proposal is acceptable", kills Edgar, and begins using his skin as a disguise.

The phrase is used to introduce Heston (and thence his NRA experience) to viewers of Michael Moore's 2002 documentary film Bowling for Columbine.

In 2005, the phrase was parodied by The Onion in their "300th Anniversary" issue dated June 22, 2056. A small item on the page claimed: "Grave robbers pry valuable rifle from Charlton Heston's cold, dead hands". Later in 2008, shortly after Charlton Heston's death, The Onion again parodied the phrase in a photo caption.

In 2013, Jim Carrey with The Eels created a single and accompanying music video "Cold Dead Hand", ridiculing gun culture in the United States and specifically Charlton Heston, declaring that he could not enter Heaven as even angels could not pry the gun from his hands.

Anthony Jeselnik, on his 2013 TV show, The Jeselnik Offensive, said, "They can have my gun when they pry it from my curious six-year-old's cold dead hands."

== See also ==
- Molon labe, a similar classical phrase
- "Come and take it", a slogan used in 1835 during the Texas Revolution
- They shall not pass
- Not one step back
