= Charles Odingsell Screven =

Minister in Savannah, Georgia

The Reverend Charles Odingsell Screven
- Born: February 1773; Charleston, Province of South Carolina
- Died: July 2, 1830 (aged 57); New York City, U.S.
- Resting place: Sunbury Cemetery, Sunbury, Georgia, U.S.
- Occupation: Baptist minister

Charles Odingsell Screven (February 1773 – July 2, 1830) was a noted Baptist minister in the American South.

== Life and career ==
Screven was born in 1773 in Charleston, Province of South Carolina, to James Screven and Mary Esther Odingsell. His father was killed in 1778 during the Revolutionary War. Charles's great-great-grandfather, the Reverend William Screven, had been a Baptist minister in Kittery, Province of Maine, before moving to South Carolina.

He was baptized in Charleston in 1786 by Dr. Richard Furman.

Screven graduated from Brown University in 1795 and gained his license to preach in 1801. Around this time, he inherited the Retreat Plantation near Sunbury, Georgia, where he lived briefly. He was ordained in Charleston in 1804, again by Furman and also Edmund Botsford of Georgetown and Joseph Clay of Savannah, Georgia.

In 1806, he became president of Mount Enon Academy, a Baptist education facility in Richmond County, Georgia, where it is believed he taught for two years. A college was established in 1805 but was denied a charter by the Georgia State Legislature over denomination and naming concerns, resulting in its incorporation as Mount Enon Academy in 1806.

Screven married, firstly, Lucy Barnard Jones (one of his sons with whom was Reverend James O. Screven), in 1804; then, in 1813, his cousin, Barbara Galphin Holmes.

He developed a painful eye disease, which was diagnosed as cancer, in 1802, which led to his retirement from preaching in 1821.

In 1826, Screven was given an honorary Doctor of Divinity degree by Brown University.

== Death ==
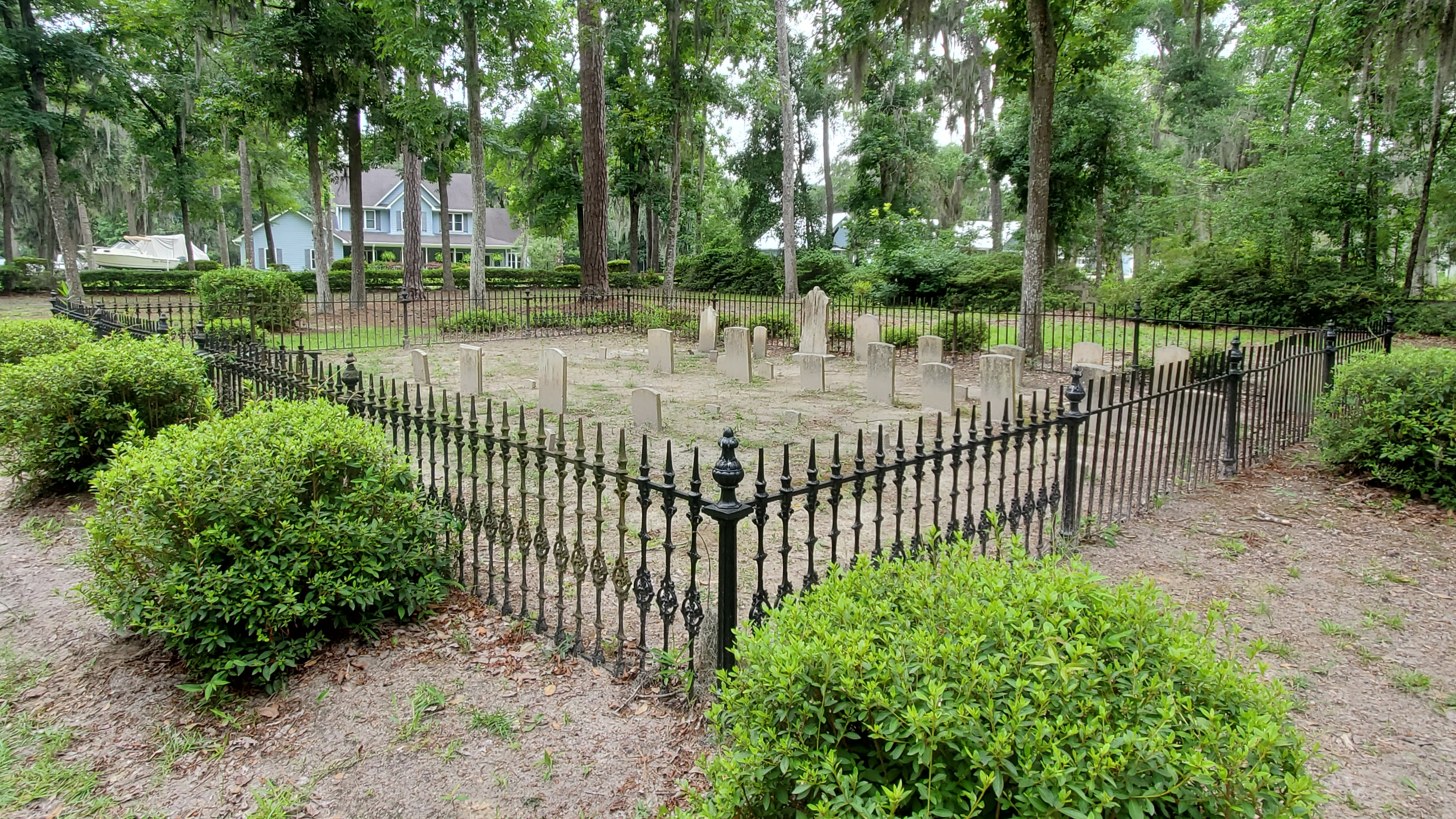
Sunbury Cemetery

Screven died in 1830, aged 57, while in New York City, having recently sailed there from Savannah. His funeral was held at 53 Charlton Street, the home of his friend, the Reverend Benjamin Mortimer. He was interred in Sunbury Cemetery in Sunbury.

=== Legacy ===
In 1860, Screven was one of the subjects about whom William Buell Sprague wrote in his Annals of the American Pulpit: Baptist.
