= Molon labe =

Classical Greek phrase meaning 'come and take [them]'

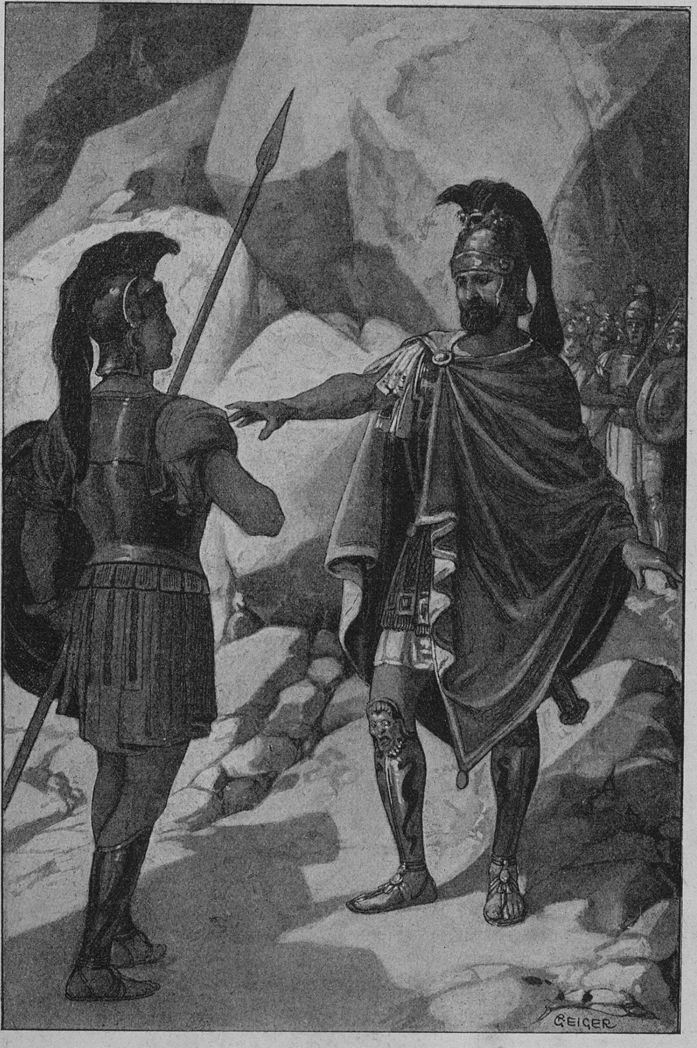
Print by Richard Geiger of Leonidas I sending a messenger to the Spartans, 1900

Molṑn labé (Greek: μολὼν λαβέ, transl. "come and take [them]") is a Greek phrase attributed to Leonidas I of Sparta during his written correspondence with Xerxes I of Persia on the eve of the Battle of Thermopylae in 480 BC. A classical expression of defiance, it is among the Laconic phrases reported by the Greek historian Plutarch, and is said to have been Leonidas's response to Xerxes's demand that the Spartan army lay down their weapons and surrender to the Persian army during the second Persian invasion of Greece.

== Grammar ==
The phrase "molṑn labé" is in the Classical Greek of Plutarch, and does not necessarily reflect the Doric dialect that Leonidas would have used. The form ἔμολον is recorded in Doric as the aorist for εἷρπον, "to go, come". The classical pronunciation is [mo.lɔ᷆ːn la.bé], the Modern Greek pronunciation [moˈlon laˈve]. (Note: At the time of Plutarch, when the phrase was recorded, the pronunciation would have been somewhere between the classical and the modern, approximately [mo'loːn la'βe].)

The phrase is participial, and the translation would be "when you come, take it!" This use of the participle is known as the circumstantial participle in the grammar of classical Greek, i.e. the participle gives a circumstance (the coming) attendant on the main verb (the taking). It is a form of hypotaxis, where English would use parataxis, the conjunction of two verbs, "come and take". This construction normally (but not always) occurs within narrative literature.

The first word, μολών (molṓn, "having come"), is the aorist active participle (masculine, nominative, singular) of the Greek verb βλώσκω (blṓskō, "to come").

The aorist stem is μολ- (from a verbal root reconstructed as *melh₃-, *mlō-, "to appear"). The presence of word-initial /b/ in βλώσκω can be explained through its epenthesis between μ and λ, with the former dropping. The aorist participle is used in cases where an action has been completed, also called the perfective aspect. This is a nuance indicating that the first action (the coming) must precede the second (the taking).

The second word, λαβέ, is the second person singular aorist imperative of λαμβάνω "take; grasp, seize". The entire phrase is thus in the singular, i.e. Leonidas is depicted as addressing Xerxes personally, not the Persian army as a group.

== Origin ==
Plutarch cites the phrase in his Apophthegmata Laconica ("Sayings of Spartans"). The exchange between Leonidas and Xerxes occurs in writing, on the eve of the Battle of Thermopylae (480 BC):

πάλιν δὲ τοῦ Ξέρξου γράψαντος 'πέμψον τὰ ὅπλα,' ἀντέγραψε 'μολὼν λαβέ.'

Translation:

When Xerxes wrote again, 'Hand over your arms,' he wrote in reply, 'Come and take them.'

— trans. Frank Cole Babbitt, 1931

The exchange is cited in a collection of sayings by Leonidas before the Battle of Thermopylae (51.2–15).

The main source for the events of the battle is Herodotus. According to his account, the Spartans held Thermopylae for three days, and although ultimately defeated, they inflicted serious damage on the Persian army. Most importantly, this delayed the Persians' progress to Athens, providing sufficient time for the city's evacuation to the island of Salamis. Though a tactical defeat, Thermopylae served as a strategic and moral victory, inspiring the Greek forces to defeat the Persians at the Battle of Salamis later the same year and the Battle of Plataea one year later.

== Modern usage ==
=== Greece ===
Modern use of 'ΜΟΛΩΝ ΛΑΒΕ' as a military motto appears to originate in the Kingdom of Greece during the First World War or the Greco-Turkish War. The motto was on the emblem of the I Army Corps of Greece. The phrase was inscribed on the Thermopylae monument (1955), using an archaic script that would be appropriate for the time of the Persian Wars.

During the Cyprus Emergency, EOKA commander Grigoris Afxentiou was surrounded by British Army troops in his secret hideout near the Machairas Monastery on 3 March 1957. The British demanded he surrender his weapons, and Afxentiou shouted molon labe in reply. After he killed a corporal of the Duke of Wellington's Regiment with his submachine gun, the Royal Engineers poured petrol into his hideout and set it on fire, killing Afxentiou.

=== United States ===
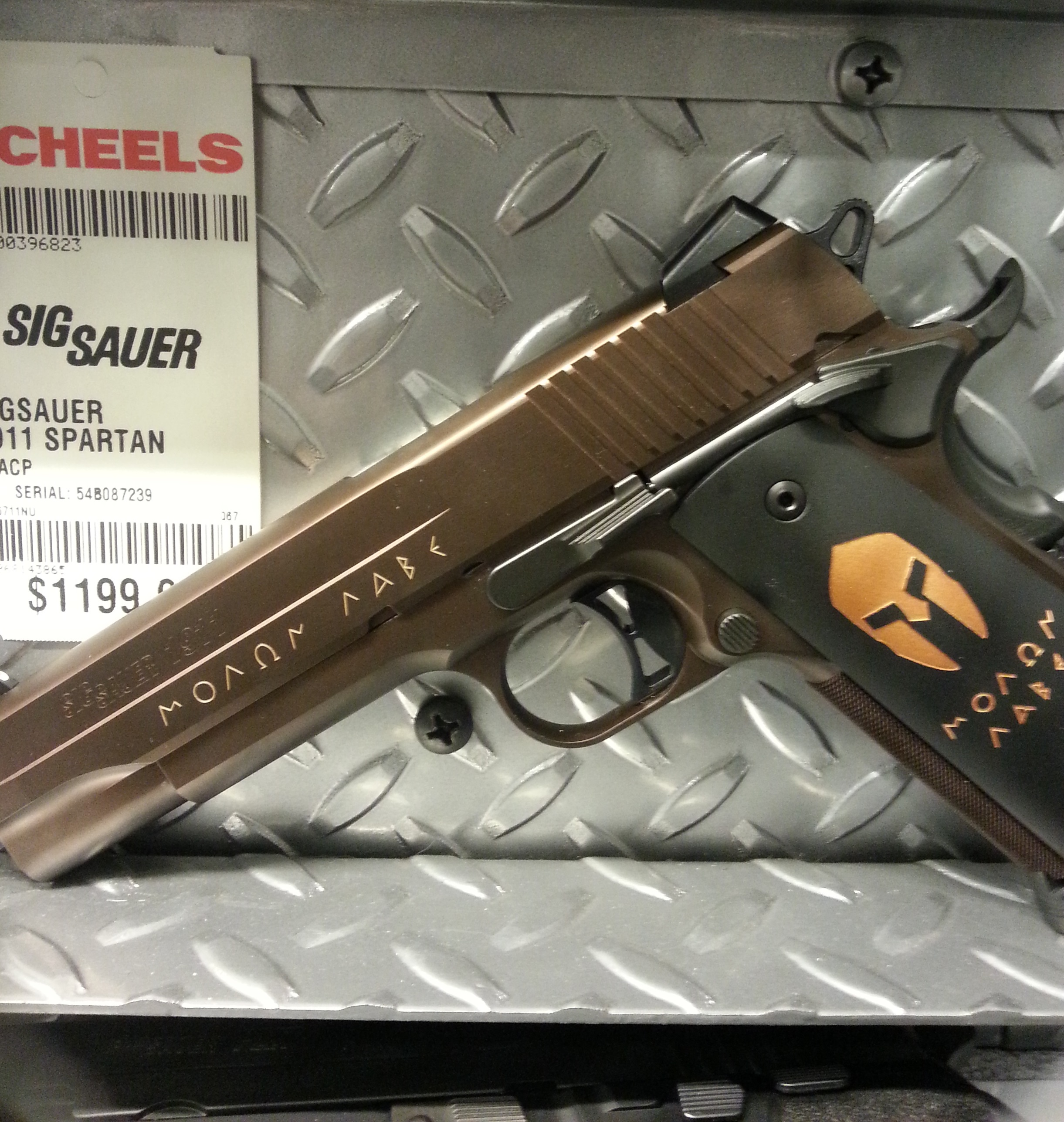
The phrase inscribed on a SIG Sauer 1911 "Spartan" semi-automatic pistol in the United States, 2015

Allusion to the phrase in an English translation ("come and take it!") is recorded in the context of the Revolutionary War, noted in 1778 at Fort Morris in the Province of Georgia, and later in 1835 at the Battle of Gonzales during the Texas Revolution where it became a prevalent slogan.

Use of the classical Greek in the United States is more recent. Its use by militia organizations is reported for the 1990s or early 2000s. It is the motto of the Special Operations Command Central (SOCCENT).

In the United States, the original Greek phrase and its English translation are often heard as a defense of the right to keep and bear arms and opposition to gun control legislation.

== See also ==
- From my cold, dead hands
- Nuts!
- Russian warship, go fuck yourself
- They shall not pass
- OXI
