= Colonels Island, Georgia =

Island in Georgia, United States

Coordinates: 31°42′40″N 81°15′50″W

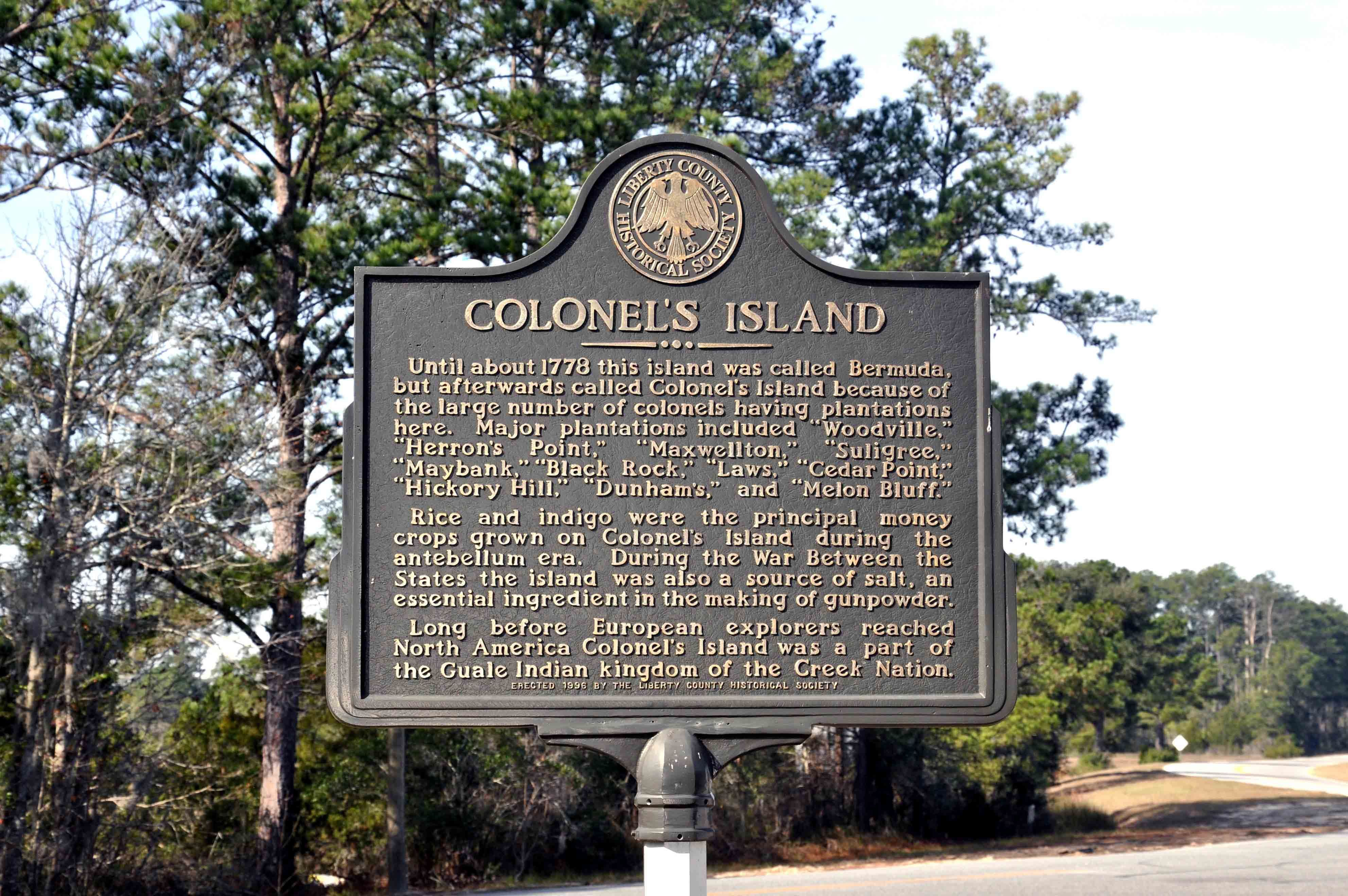
A Georgia Historical Marker present at the entrance of Colonels Island. To the right of the sign is the causeway into the island, U.S. Route 84.

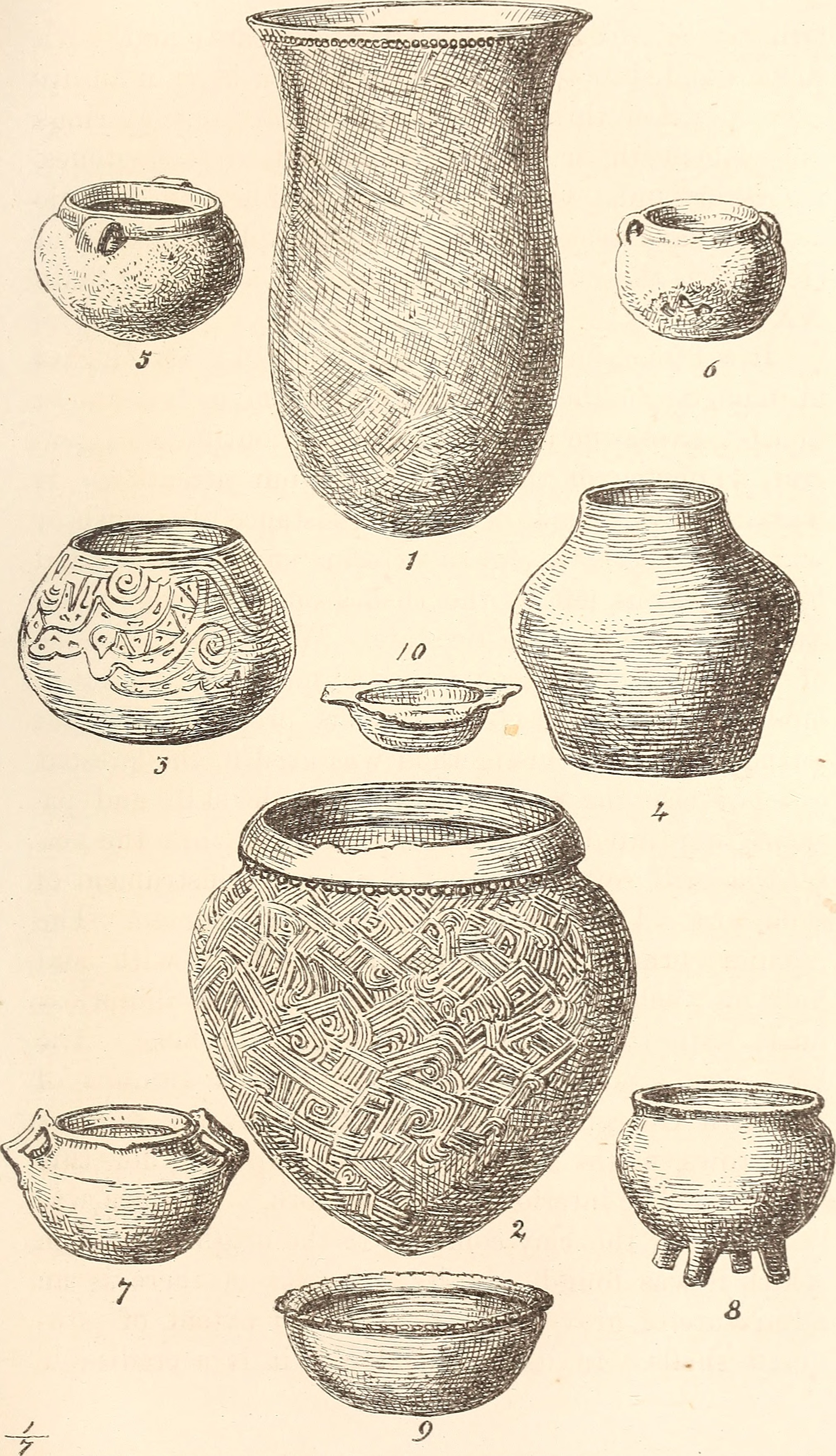
One of these was found in a mound on Colonels Island and included in a book on antiquities of "southern Indians"

Colonels Island is a remote-inhabited island in the U.S. state of Georgia. It was named for all the colonels who established plantations on it.

Prior to the arrival of Europeans, the area was inhabited by members of the Guale culture.

Part of Liberty County, Georgia, Colonels Island was home to Colonel Alexander Herron's plantation, called "Herron's Point". Many of the plantations used to grow rice and indigo, which were two of the large cash crops that Georgia grew during the antebellum era. The island was originally known as Bermuda Island and reportedly had many people from Bermuda, but many died of malaria and the rest fled.

Residents on the island travel via U.S. Route 84 to get on and off the island; the road terminates on Colonels Island.
