= Coastal Courier =

Newspaper published in Hinesville, Georgia

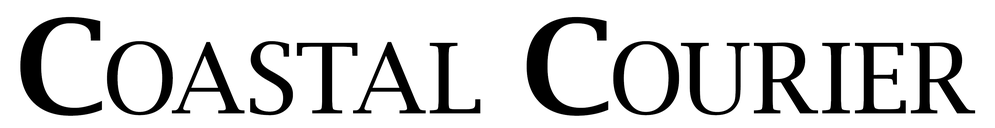

- Front page on May 21, 2017
- Type: Weekly newspaper
- Owner: Morris Multimedia
- Founder(s): Samuel Dowse Bradwell; R. N. Andrews
- Editor: Patrick Donahue
- Founded: April 1871 (as the Hinesville Gazette)
- Political alignment: Democratic Party (1871–1891); People's Party (c. 1891)
- Language: English
- Headquarters: 125 South Main Street
- City: Hinesville, Georgia
- Country: United States
- Circulation: 5,500 (as of 2012)
- ISSN: 1047-6636
- OCLC number: 19405761
- Website: coastalcourier.com

The Coastal Courier is an American newspaper published in Hinesville, Georgia. It was established as the Hinesville Gazette in 1871 and serves as the newspaper of record for Liberty County, Georgia.

== History ==
=== Establishment and early history ===
The newspaper traces its history to April 1871, when the Hinesville Gazette was first published in Hinesville, Georgia, by Samuel Dowse Bradwell and R. N. Andrews. The newspaper was the first published in Liberty County, Georgia, and served as the legal organ for the county. The paper was initially published weekly at a subscription cost of $3, which was reduced to $1 after its first year. In addition to running the newspaper, Bradwell was a noted educator who served as the principal of the Hinesville Institute, which was later renamed Bradwell Institute after his father. In 1891, Bradwell was appointed the State Superintendent of Schools, necessitating his move to Atlanta and his transference of the daily operations of the newspaper to Stephen A. Calder. Under Calder, the Gazette, which had traditionally been a supporter of the Democratic Party, switched its support to the People's Party. In December 1892, the Herald Publishing Company, a joint-stock company, was established and purchased the Gazette, renaming it the Liberty County Herald in 1893. In 1911, Editor & Publisher reported that the newspaper had been purchased by the Hinesville Publishing Company and had leased it to G. W. Cooper.

=== 1980s and onwards ===
In 1980, the Herald merged with the Bryan County News of nearby Bryan County to become the Coastal Courier. The following year, Turner Broadcasting System reported that the Courier was one of 31 newspapers in the United States that were either involved in or planning on becoming involved in creating local programming for cable television. In March 1982, the Morris Newspaper Corporation of Savannah, Georgia, announced that, through its subsidiary MNC of Hinesville, Inc., they had purchased the Courier. In the 1997 Best Newspaper Contest held by the Georgia Press Association, the Courier won ten awards, including the first place award in General Excellence for its circulation category, making it one of the most decorated newspapers in the state. That same year, staff writer Anne Cordiero was awarded a scholarship by the Georgia Press Educational Foundation to attend seminars hosted by the American Press Institute.

== Circulation ==
In 1983, Editor & Publisher reported that the Courier had a circulation of about 6,600 for the previous year. However, multiple volumes of a statewide almanac published in the 1980s reported that the newspaper, which released new issues on Wednesdays and Fridays, had a circulation of between 4,000 and 5,500. In 1997, the newspaper's circulation stood between 3,500 and 5,999. By 2003, the newspaper was publishing thrice weekly, and in 2012, the newspaper was publishing Sunday, Wednesday, and Friday editions and had an estimated paid circulation of 5,500.
