= Fort Morris Historic Site =

- U.S. National Register of Historic Places
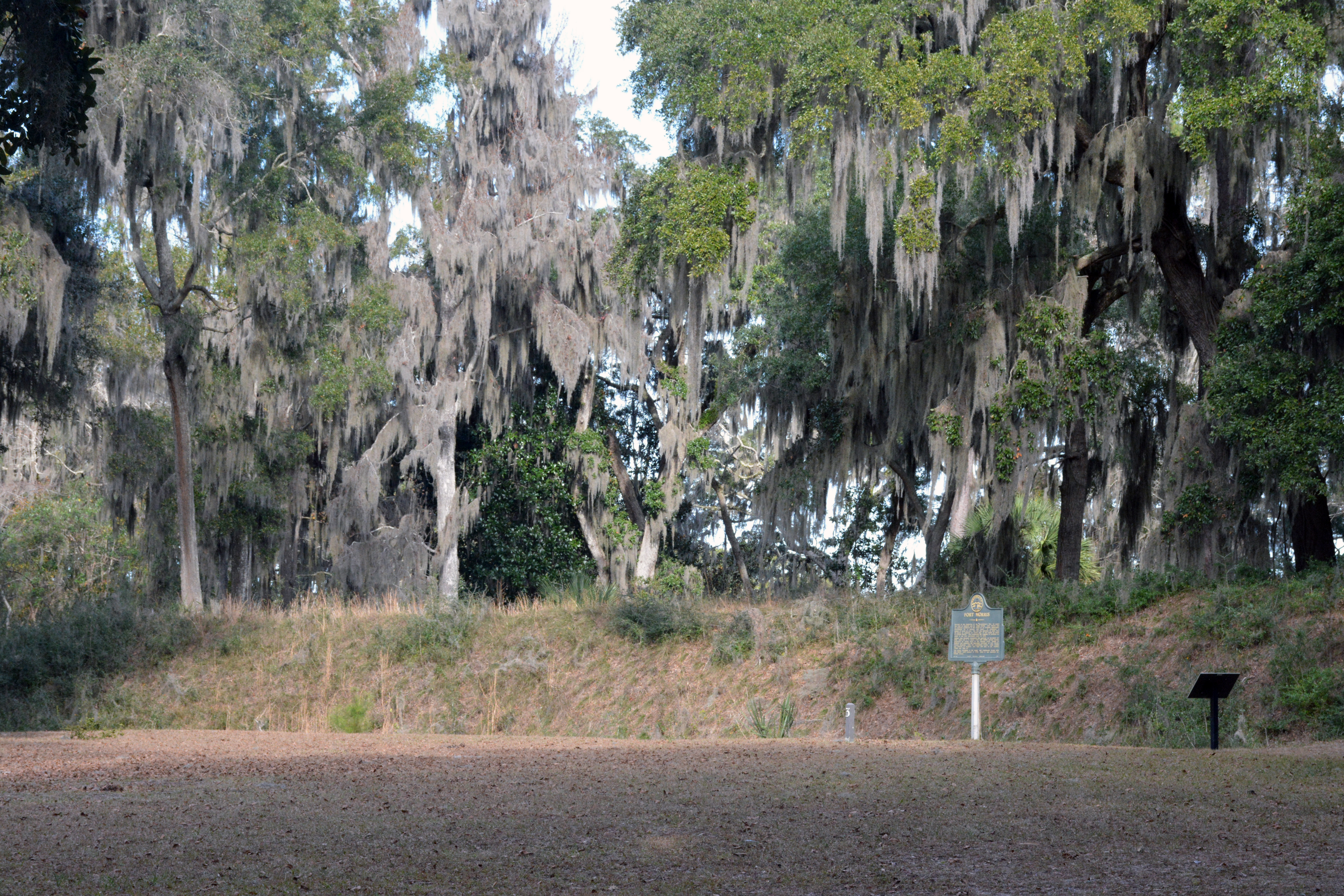
- Earthworks at Fort Morris

- Location within Georgia Location within the United States
- Nearest city: Midway, Georgia
- Coordinates: 31.7618°N 81.2812°W
- Area: 7 acres (2.8 ha)
- NRHP reference No.: 70000208
- Added to NRHP: May 13, 1970

Fort Morris Historic Site is a Georgia state historic park in Liberty County, Georgia, in the United States. The fort is on a bend in the Medway River and played an important role in the protection of southeast Georgia throughout various conflicts beginning in 1741 and ending in 1865 at the conclusion of the American Civil War, including the French and Indian and American Revolutionary Wars and War of 1812. The historic site is 70 acres (28 ha) and sits at an elevation of 23 feet (7.0 m).

On May 13, 1970, the fort was added to the National Register of Historic Places as Fort Morris.

== History of the fort ==
The first fort on the site was constructed in 1741 and used in the War of Jenkins' Ear to protect a plantation owned by Captain Mark Carr. His plantation came under attack on March 18, 1741, by a group of Indians who were allies with the Spanish colonial forces in Florida. Several soldiers defending the fort were killed in the raid and the contents of the fort and plantation were taken away in a large boat that belonged to the plantation.

The next fort at the site was constructed in 1756 at the encouragement of locals who were being attacked during uprising of Creek Indians in the era during the French and Indian War. The fort was expanded in 1758 to provide protection for the new settlement of Sunbury which was built on land owned by Carr.

The need to defend the Medway River and Sunbury rose again at the outset of the American Revolution. Fort Morris was attacked by the British on January 9, 1779, and was taken the next day. The fort was renamed Fort George and was occupied by the British until September 1779.

The fort fell into disrepair once again in the years following the Revolution. The need to defend Sunbury and the river rose again with the outset of the War of 1812. Fort Defiance was constructed on the site of the former Fort Morris in 1814. Construction of the fort was not completed prior to the end of the war and it was left unfinished.

Fort Morris and Sunbury played a minor role in the American Civil War. A small group of Confederate soldiers were stationed at Sunbury and may have used the fort. General William T. Sherman's March to the Sea brought an influx of Union soldiers to the area. They removed some cannons from the fort in 1864 to be taken to Union-controlled forts on the Atlantic coast.

== Park ==
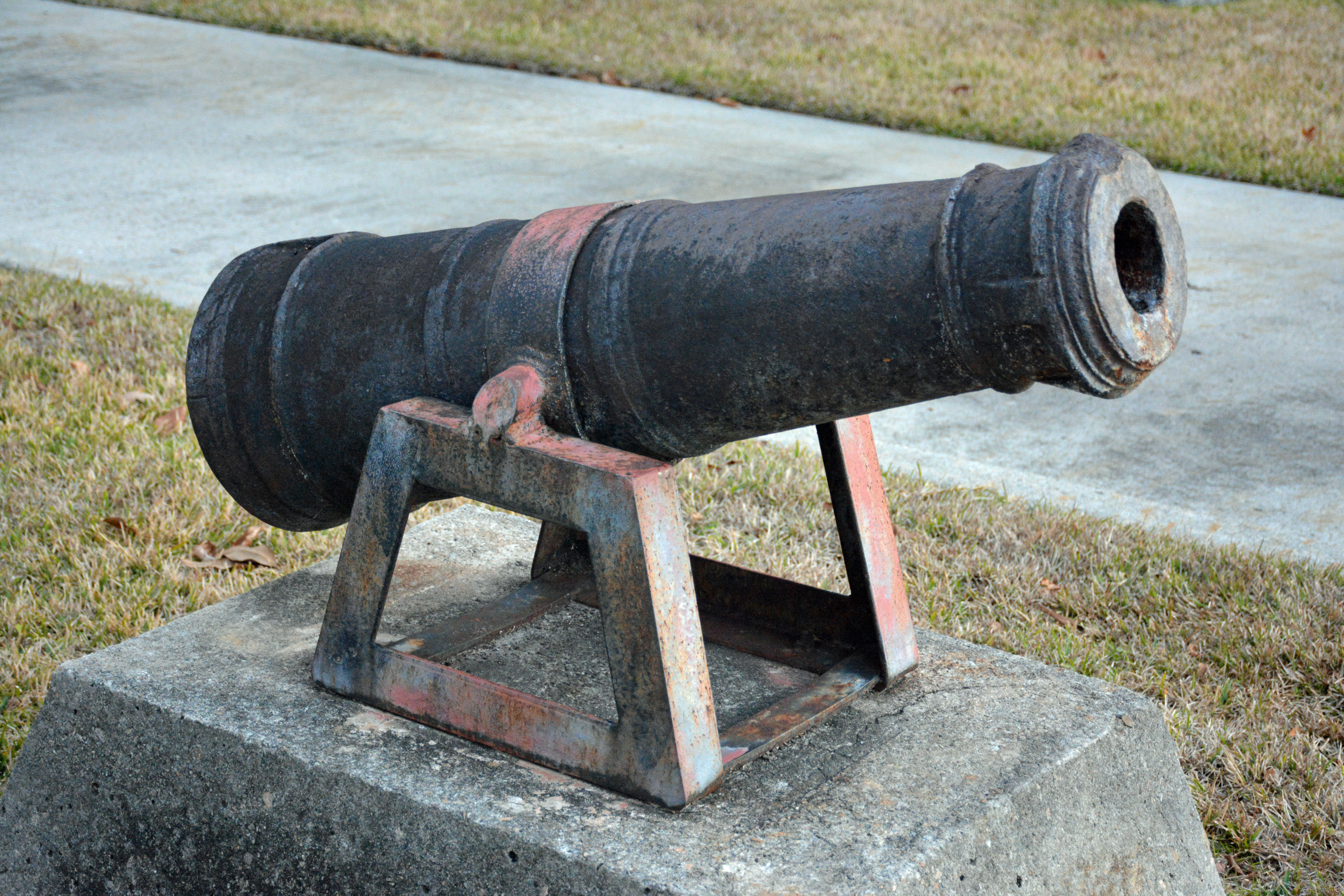
A cannon from Fort Morris, on display at the Liberty County Courthouse in Hinesville, Georgia, U.S.

Fort Morris Historic Site is owned by the state of Georgia and preserves the historical remains of the various forts that were once on the site. Earthworks are still standing at the park and show the size of the fort that once defended the Medway River.

Three historic interpretive events are held at the park. A Labor Day celebration includes tours given by guides in historic recreations of military uniforms and musket and cannon firings. A re-enactment of Colonel McIntosh's 1778 stand takes place in November. The re-enactment includes firings of weapons and a skirmish. A Colonial Christmas is celebrated at the fort with colonial area treats, music and bonfire.

Park facilities include a visitor center with a film and exhibits, a nature trail and picnic areas. The Pioneer Campground is open to groups. A 1-mile nature trail provides visitors with a glimpse of the wildlife and plants of the area.

== See also ==
- Fort Morris
