= Liberty County Courthouse (Georgia) =

- U.S. National Register of Historic Places
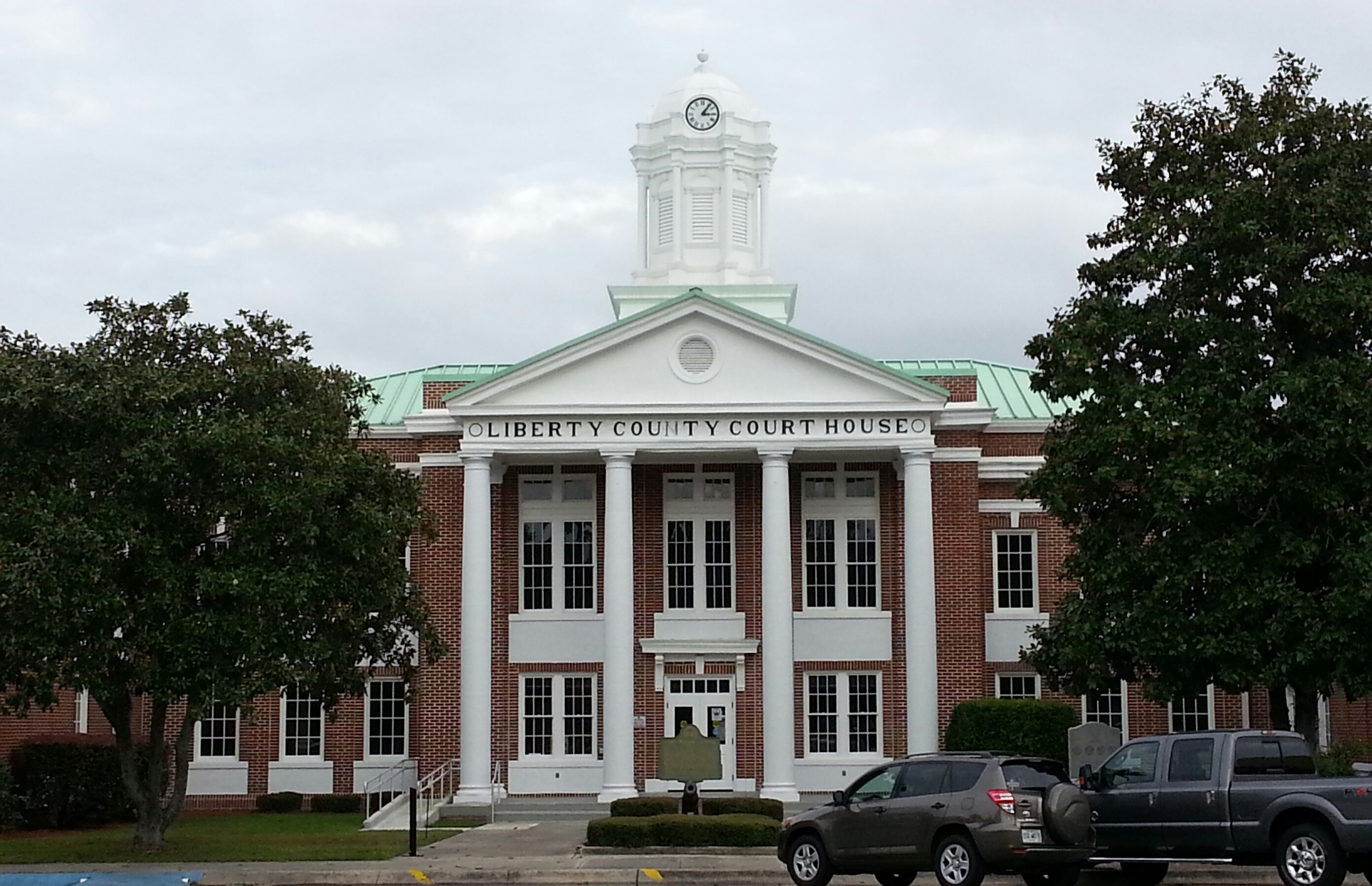

- Location within Georgia Location within the United States
- Interactive map showing the location of Liberty County Courthouse
- Location: Courthouse Sq., Hinesville, Georgia
- Coordinates: 31.84769°N 81.59577°W
- Built: 1926
- Architect: J. J. Baldwin
- Architectural style: Classical Revival
- MPS: Georgia County Courthouses TR
- NRHP reference No.: 80001105
- Added to NRHP: September 18, 1980

Liberty County Courthouse is a historic two-story domed redbrick government building located at 100 Main Street in Hinesville, Liberty County, Georgia, Built in 1926, it was designed by J. J. Baldwin in the Classical Revival style of architecture. Architecturally complementary wings were added in 1965. On September 18, 1980, it was added to the National Register of Historic Places.

== Photo ==
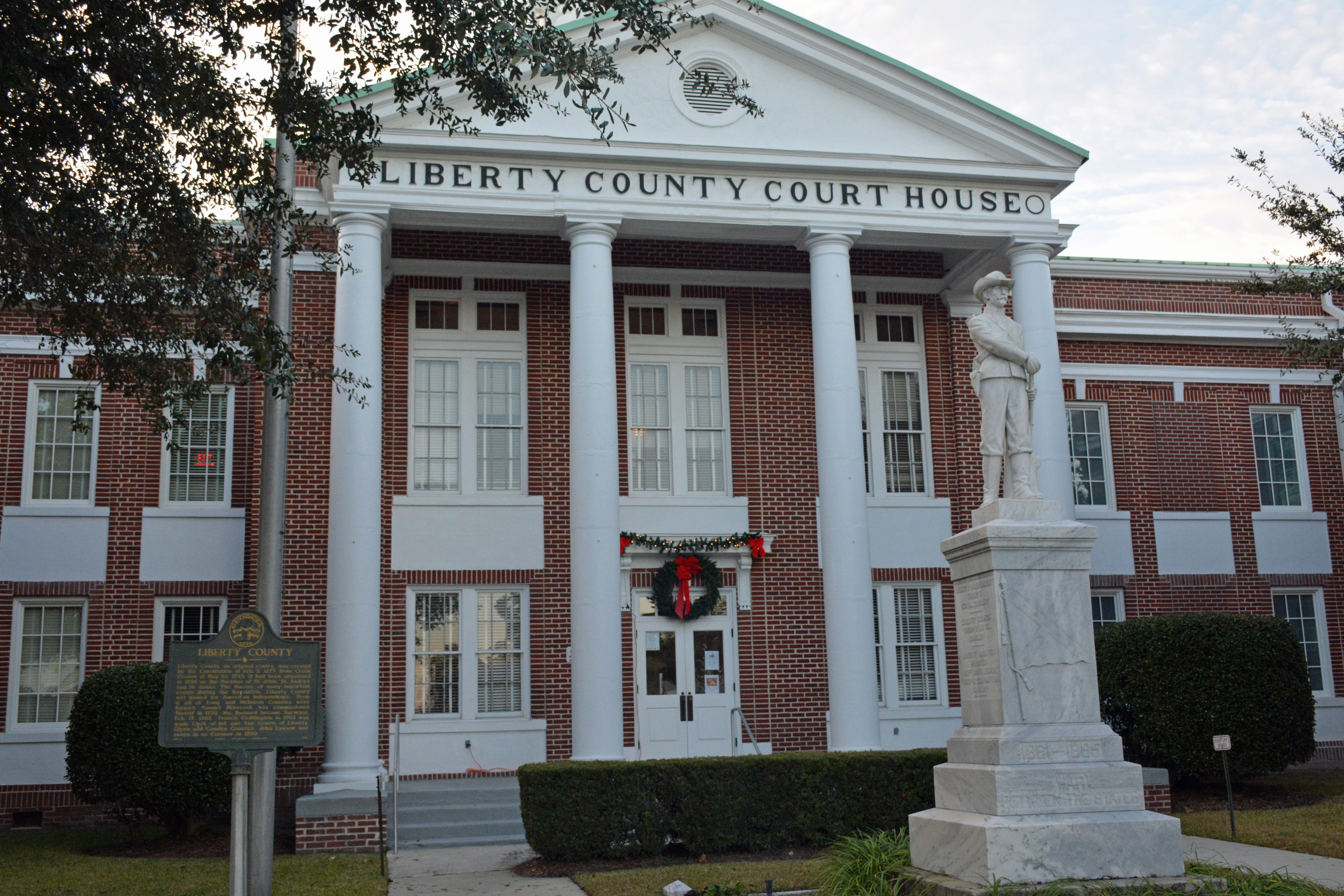
Front side

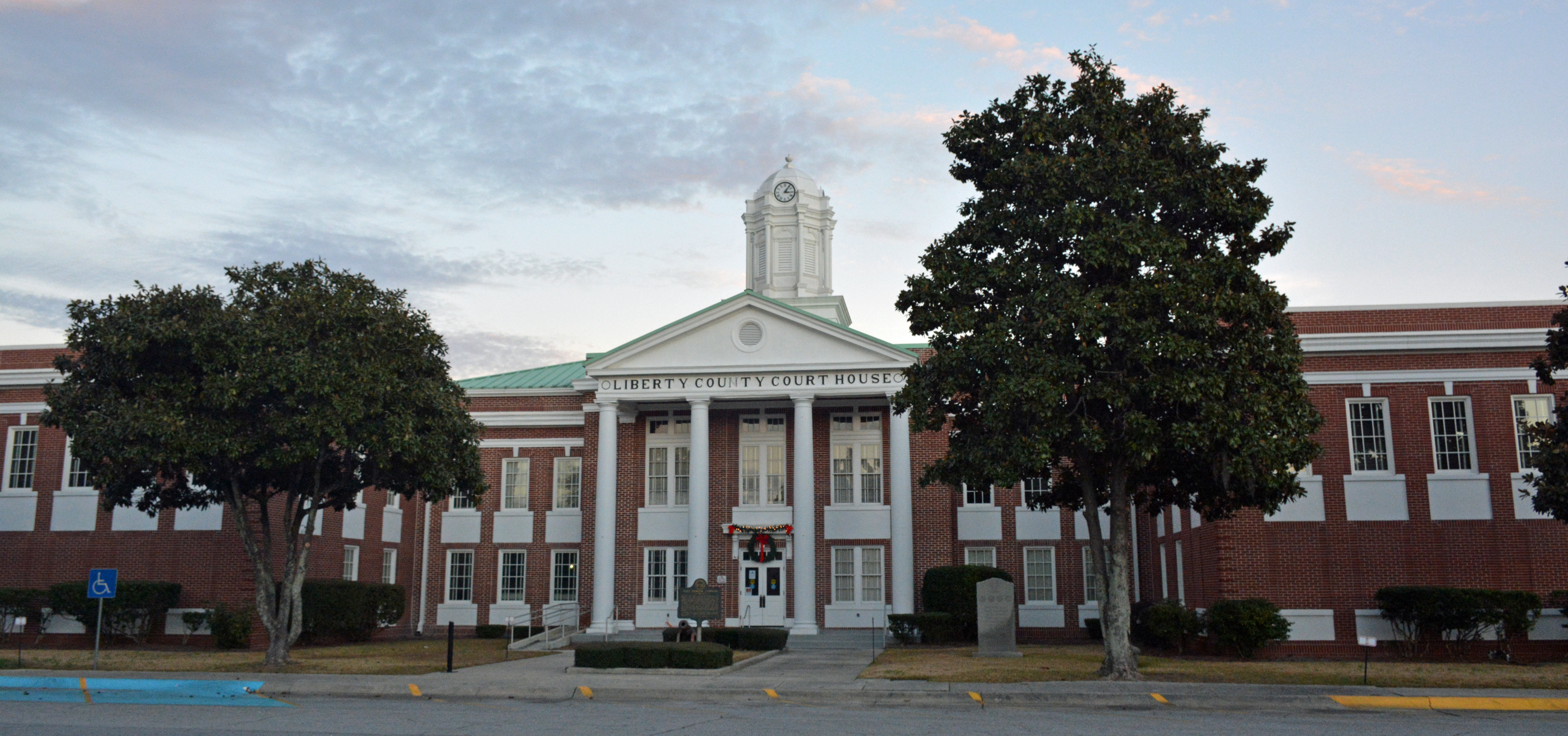
Back side
