= They shall not pass =

Military slogan

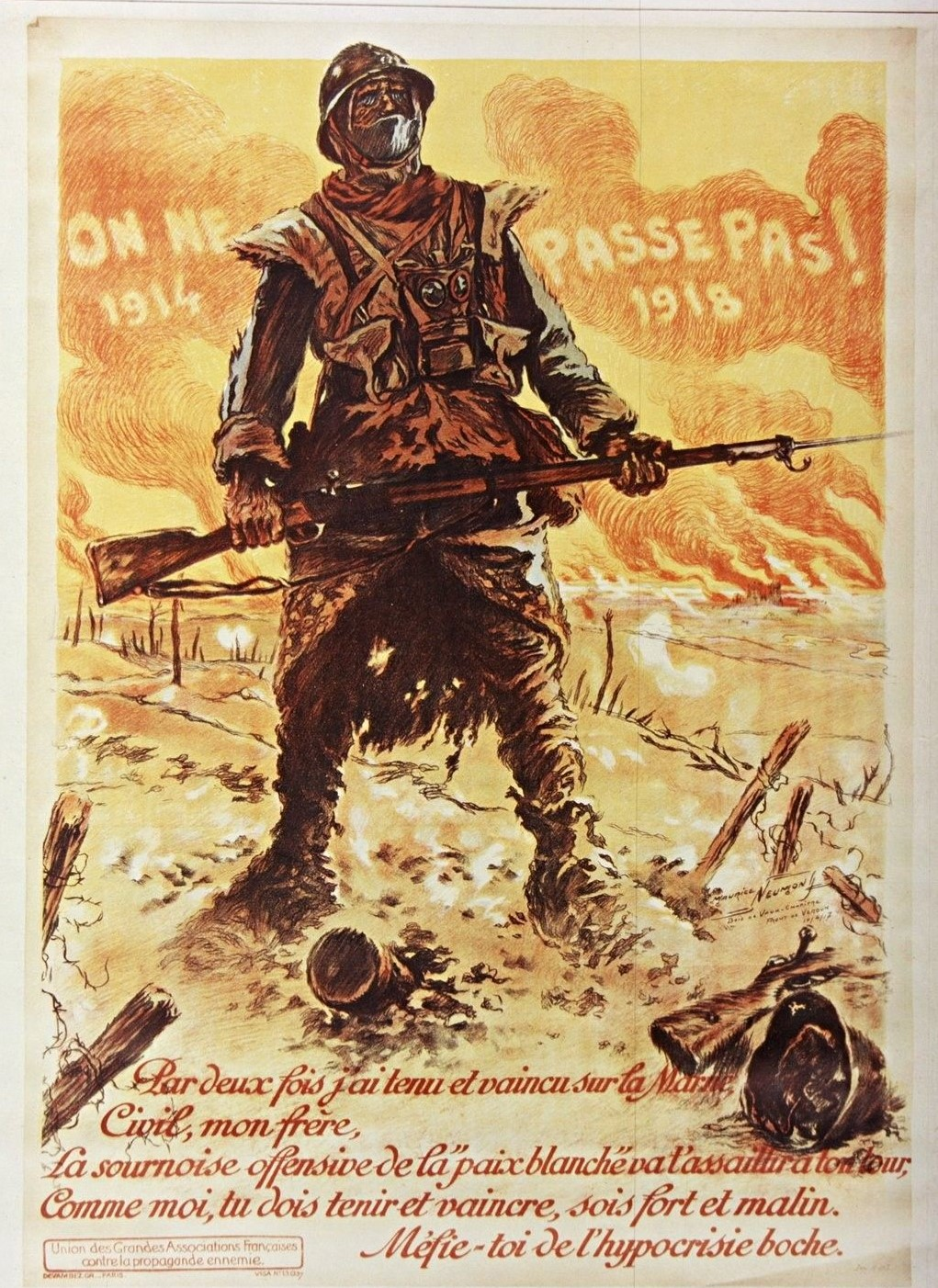
On ne passe pas ! on a 1918 French propaganda poster

"They shall not pass," (Note: French: Ils ne passeront pas and French: On ne passe pas; Romanian: Pe aici nu se trece; Spanish: No pasarán; Portuguese: Não passarão)) also sometimes evoked in its Spanish-language form "No pasarán", is a slogan associated with anti-fascism and foreign volunteer fighters. It was notably used in France in World War I and by the Republican faction during the Spanish Civil War to express a determination to defend a position against an enemy. Spanish communist Dolores Ibárruri used the slogan to rally the Republican defenders of Madrid against Francisco Franco's nationalist forces. The phrase has become an enduring symbol of anti-fascist resistance worldwide.

== Origin ==
The widespread use of the slogan originates from the 1916 Battle of Verdun in the First World War when French Army General Robert Nivelle urged his troops not to let the enemy pass. The simplified slogan of "they shall not pass" appeared on French war propaganda posters, most notably by French artist Maurice Neumont in the last year of the war after the Allied victory at the Second Battle of the Marne.

Later during the First World War, the slogan was also used by Romanian Army soldiers during the Battle of Mărășești, with the Romanian translation of the phrase being "Pe aici nu se trece", translating as "One does not pass through here."

It has also been use in the late 19th century in the context of the Brazilian War of Canudos.

== Later use ==
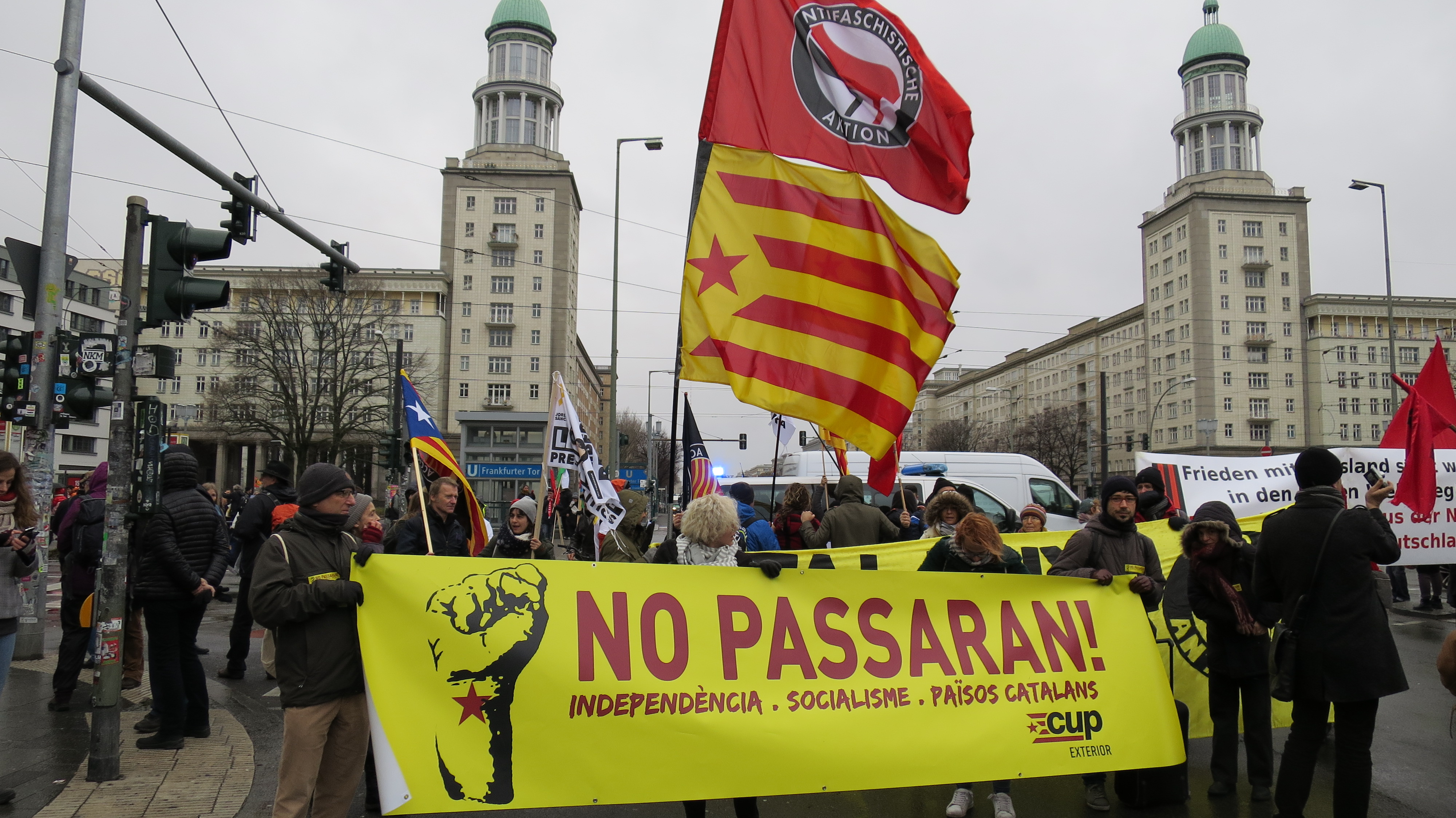
Socialist Catalan independence movement protestors holding a No passaran! sign at a protest in Berlin

French socialist politician Léon Blum (SFIO), in 1934, used this sentence "Ils ne passeront pas !" against the Ligue's demonstration of 6 February. Ils ("they") designated the nationalist protesters.

It was also used during the Spanish Civil War, this time at the siege of Madrid by Dolores Ibárruri Gómez ("Pasionaria"), a member of the Communist Party of Spain, in her famous "No pasarán" speech.

"¡No pasarán!" was used by British anti-fascists during the October 1936 Battle of Cable Street, and is still used in this context in some political circles. It was often accompanied by the words ¡Nosotros pasaremos! (we will pass) to indicate that communists rather than fascists will be the ones to seize state power.

The slogan was adopted on uniform badges by French units manning the Maginot Line.

The phrase was brought to the public consciousness again following action in December 1943 by French-Canadian officer Paul Triquet of the Royal 22^{e} Regiment; his action included his use of Nivelle's phrase "to win a key objective at Ortona, Italy, in the face of overwhelming German opposition."

In the 1980s, the phrase ¡No pasarán! was a theme in the Central American crisis, particularly in the Nicaraguan Revolution. Nicaragua no pasarán is also the title of a 1984 documentary by David Bradbury about the events in Nicaragua that led to the overthrow of Somoza's dictatorship.

In 2024, it was adopted as a motto by the 155th Mechanized Brigade (Ukraine), because it was trained and equipped by France. The slogan has also been used in associate with international volunteer fighters in the Russo-Ukrainian war.

== Gallery ==
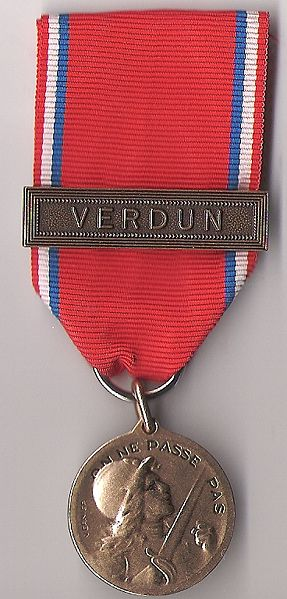
On ne passe pas !, French medal for the Battle of Verdun

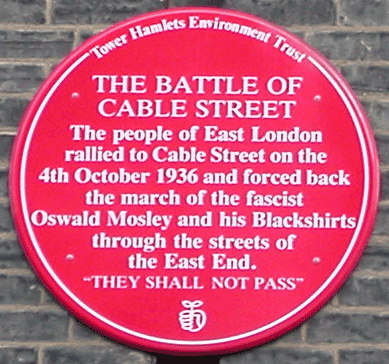
Red plaque commemorating the Battle of Cable Street

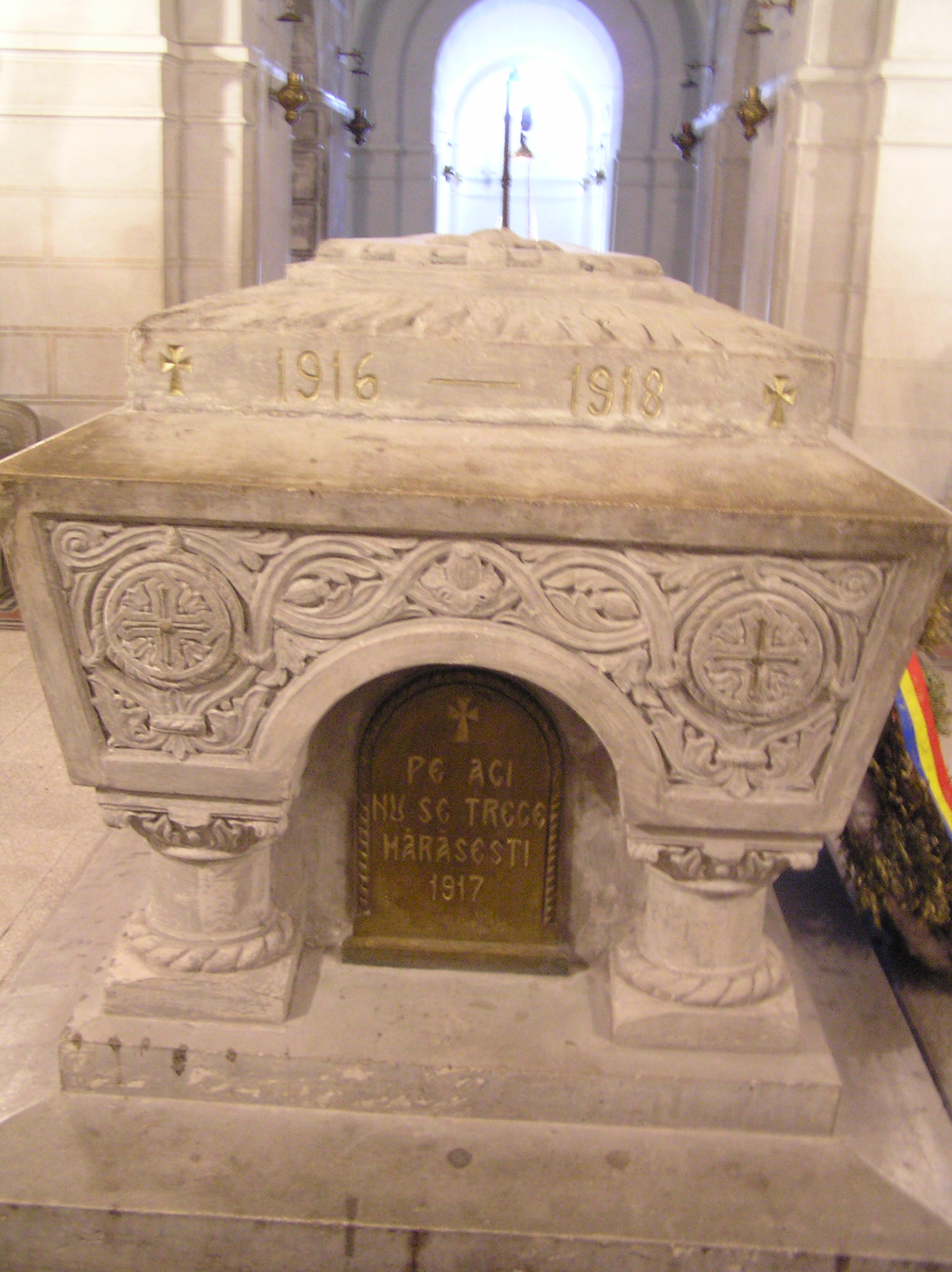
Tomb of the unknown soldier at the Mausoleum of Mărășești with the inscription "Pe aci nu se trece - Mărășești 1917"

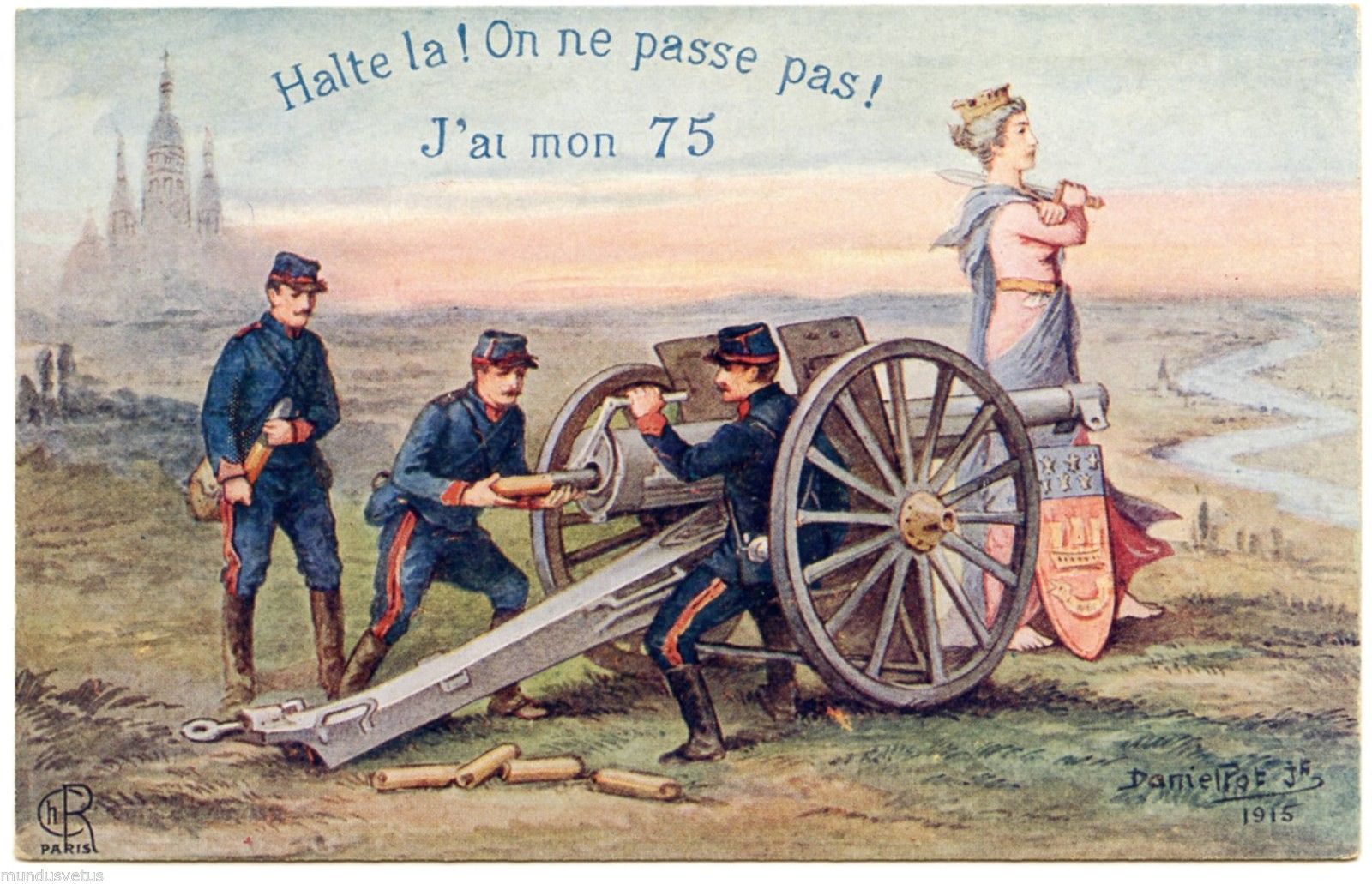
Halte la ! On ne passe pas !
French card, 1915

== See also ==
- Awake iron!
- Molon labe
- Death to fascism, freedom to the people
- Russian warship, go fuck yourself
- Order No. 227 (Stalin's "Not one step back" order)
- Venceremos
- Raised fist
- List of last stands
