= Fort Morris =

- U.S. National Register of Historic Places
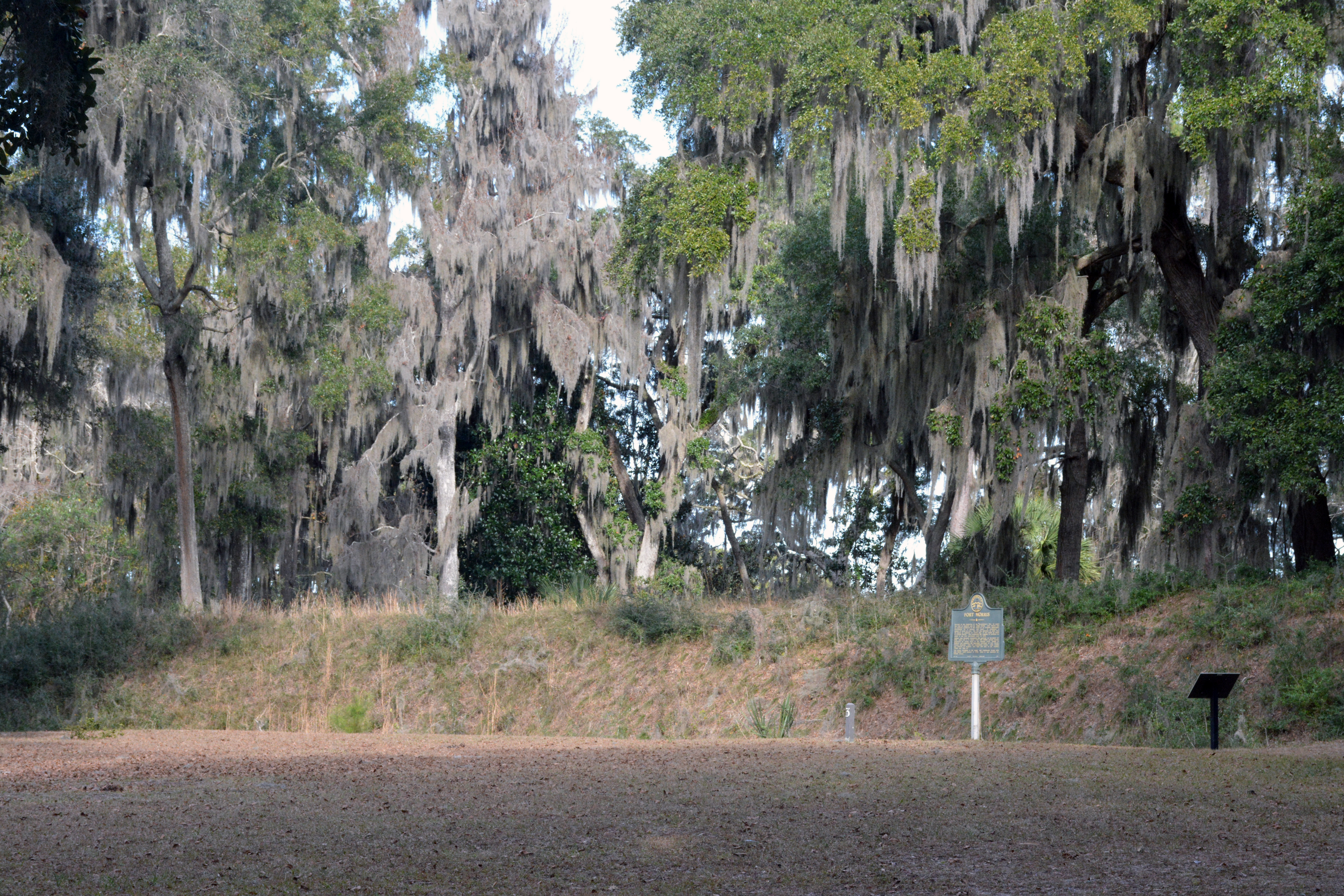
- Earthworks in the distance

- Location within Georgia Location within the United States
- Location: Near Midway, Georgia
- Nearest city: Midway, Georgia
- Coordinates: 31.76791°N 81.28119°W
- Area: 7 acres (2.8 ha)
- NRHP reference No.: 70000208
- Added to NRHP: May 13, 1970

Fort Morris is an earthen works fort in Liberty County, Georgia, in the United States. The fort is on a bend in the Medway River and played an important role in the protection of southeast Georgia throughout various conflicts beginning in 1741 and ending in 1865 at the conclusion of the American Civil War, including the French and Indian and American Revolutionary Wars and War of 1812. The historic site is 70 acres (28 ha) in size and sits at an elevation of 23 feet (7.0 m).

On May 13, 1970, the fort was added to the National Register of Historic Places. Today it is a state park, Fort Morris Historic Site.

== History ==
=== French and Indian War ===
The first fort built at the site was constructed in 1741 to protect a plantation owned by Captain Mark Carr. Carr owned 500 acres (200 ha) of land in the area that was granted to him by the Georgia Trustees. Carr was the commander of a company of marine rangers in the British Colonial Army from 1732 to 1751. His plantation came under attack on March 18, 1741, by a group of Indians who were allies with the Spanish colonial forces in Florida. Several soldiers defending the fort were killed in the raid and the contents of the fort and plantation were taken away in a large boat that belonged to the plantation.

The next fort at the site was constructed in 1756 at the encouragement of locals who were being attacked during uprising of Creek Indians in the era during the French and Indian War. The fort was expanded in 1758 to provide protection for the new settlement of Sunbury, which was built on land owned by Carr. The fort was a square with each side measuring 100 yards (91 m). Governor Henry Ellis noted that the fort had a battery of eight guns. By 1762, the fort had fallen into disrepair.

=== American Revolution ===
The need to defend the Medway River and Sunbury rose again at the outset of the American Revolutionary War. The Continental Congress authorized the construction of two forts in Georgia. One was to be built at Savannah and the other at Sunbury. A company of artillery consisting of fifty men was sent to the area. Fort Morris was built to the southeast of Sunbury and would be used first as a base for several campaigns to take British Florida and then as a defensive position in defending Sunbury and points upriver.

The colonial forces were never able to establish control of Florida, which had become a refuge for loyalists. Royal Governor Patrick Tonyn of East Florida sought to invade Georgia. The East Florida Rangers were loyalists from Georgia, South Carolina, and North Carolina. Indian allies and the British 60th regiment was part of the plan to take Georgia from the Continental Army. The East Florida Rangers, a naval fleet, and loyalists from New York were quickly able to take Savannah in 1778. They next moved to Sunbury and Fort Morris. A small contingent of British soldiers attempted to take the fort on November 25, 1778. The 200 Americans at Fort Morris were led by Colonel John McIntosh. McIntosh defiantly replied, "Come and take it!" after the British demanded the surrender of the fort. The British declined to attack and pulled back only to return in January with a larger force.

Fort Morris was attacked by the British on January 9, 1779, and was taken the next day. The number of lives lost in the siege is not well documented. Historians suppose that less than twelve American soldiers died and fewer British. The fort was renamed Fort George and was occupied by the British until September 1779, when the fort's garrison was ordered to Savannah to provide for its defense. After the fort was abandoned by the British it was taken again by colonial forces who found an empty fort with a few, damaged guns left behind. They were only able to hold the fort for a month before it was retaken by the British in October. Fort Morris/Fort George remained under the control of British forces until 1782.

=== War of 1812 ===
The fort fell into disrepair once again in the years following the Revolution. The need to defend Sunbury and the river rose again with the outset of the War of 1812. Fort Defiance was constructed on the site of the former Fort Morris in 1814. Construction of the fort was not completed prior to the end of the war and it was left unfinished.

=== American Civil War ===
Fort Morris and Sunbury played a minor role in the American Civil War. A small group of Confederate soldiers were stationed at Sunbury and may have used the fort. General William T. Sherman's March to the Sea brought an influx of Union soldiers to the area. They removed some cannons from the fort in 1864 to be taken to Union-controlled forts on the Atlantic coast.

== Photos ==
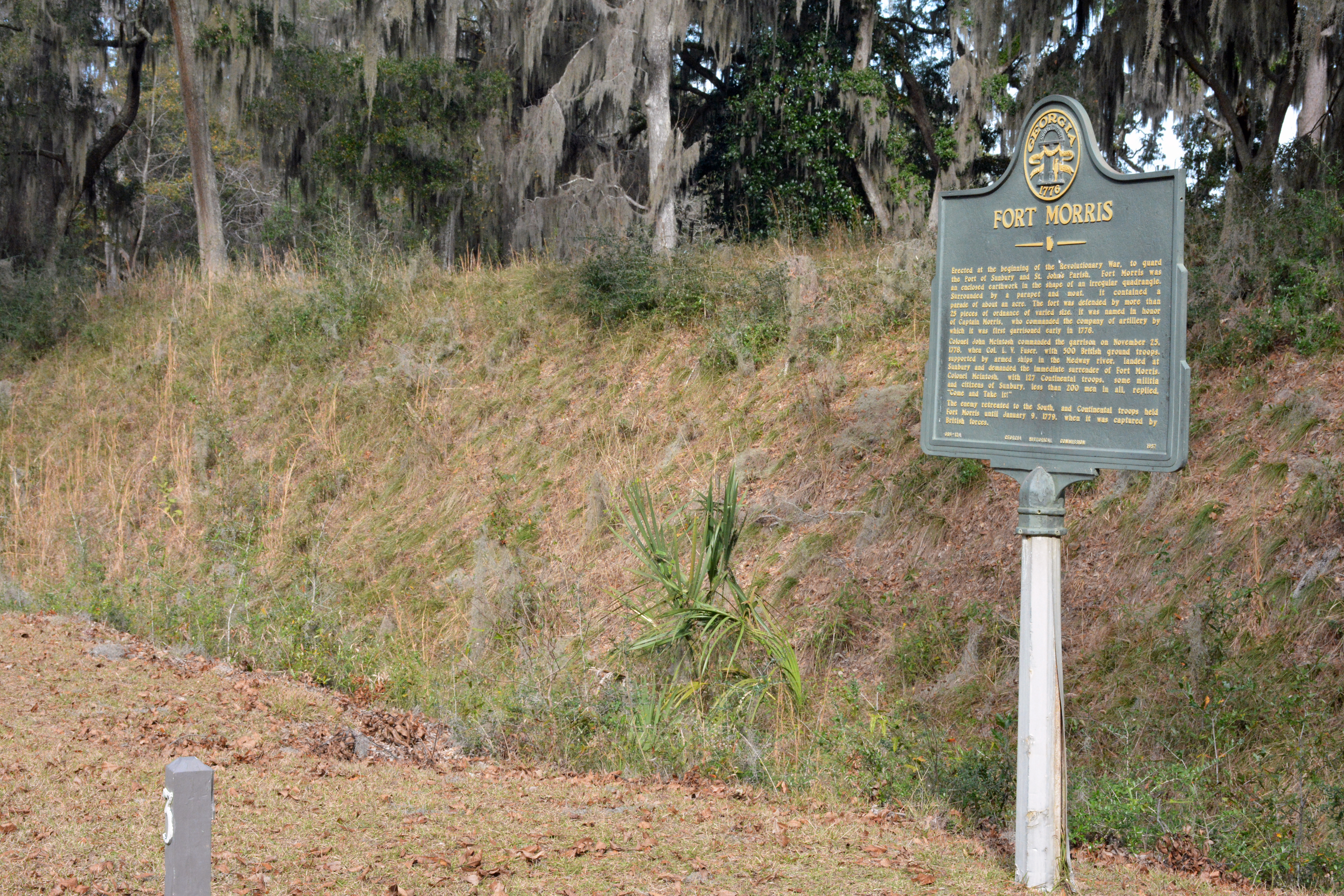
Earthworks of the fort

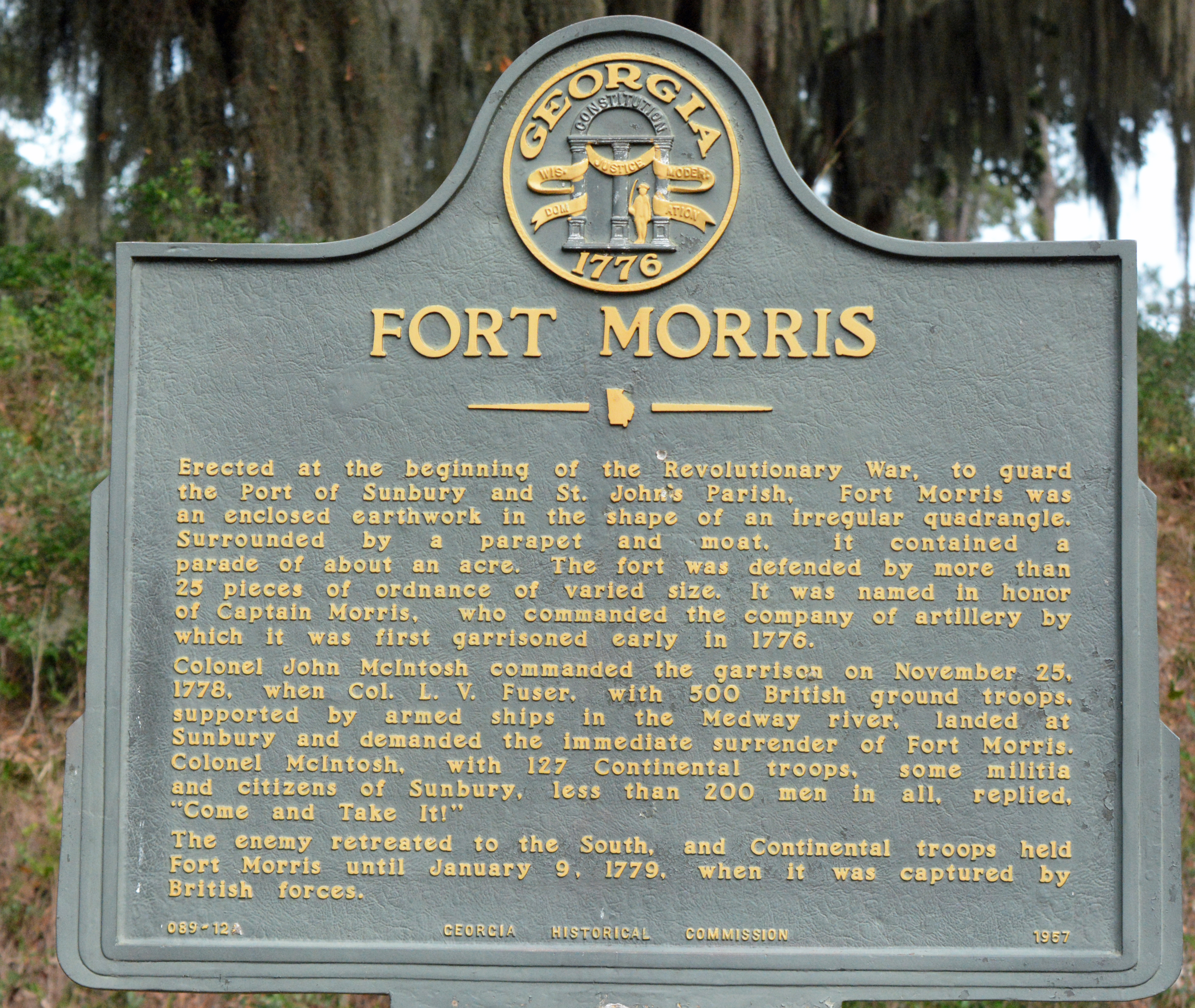
Historical marker

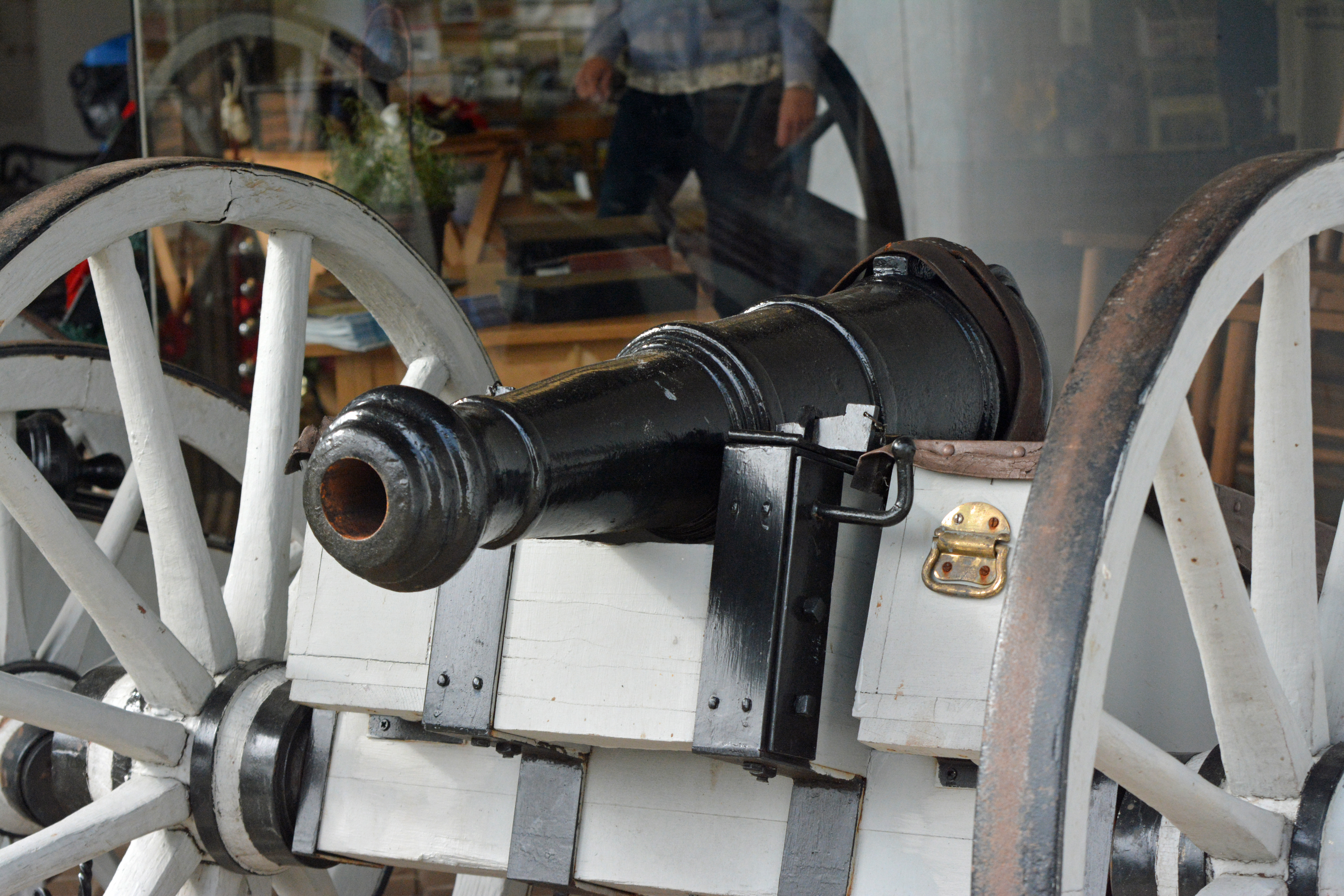
Cannon

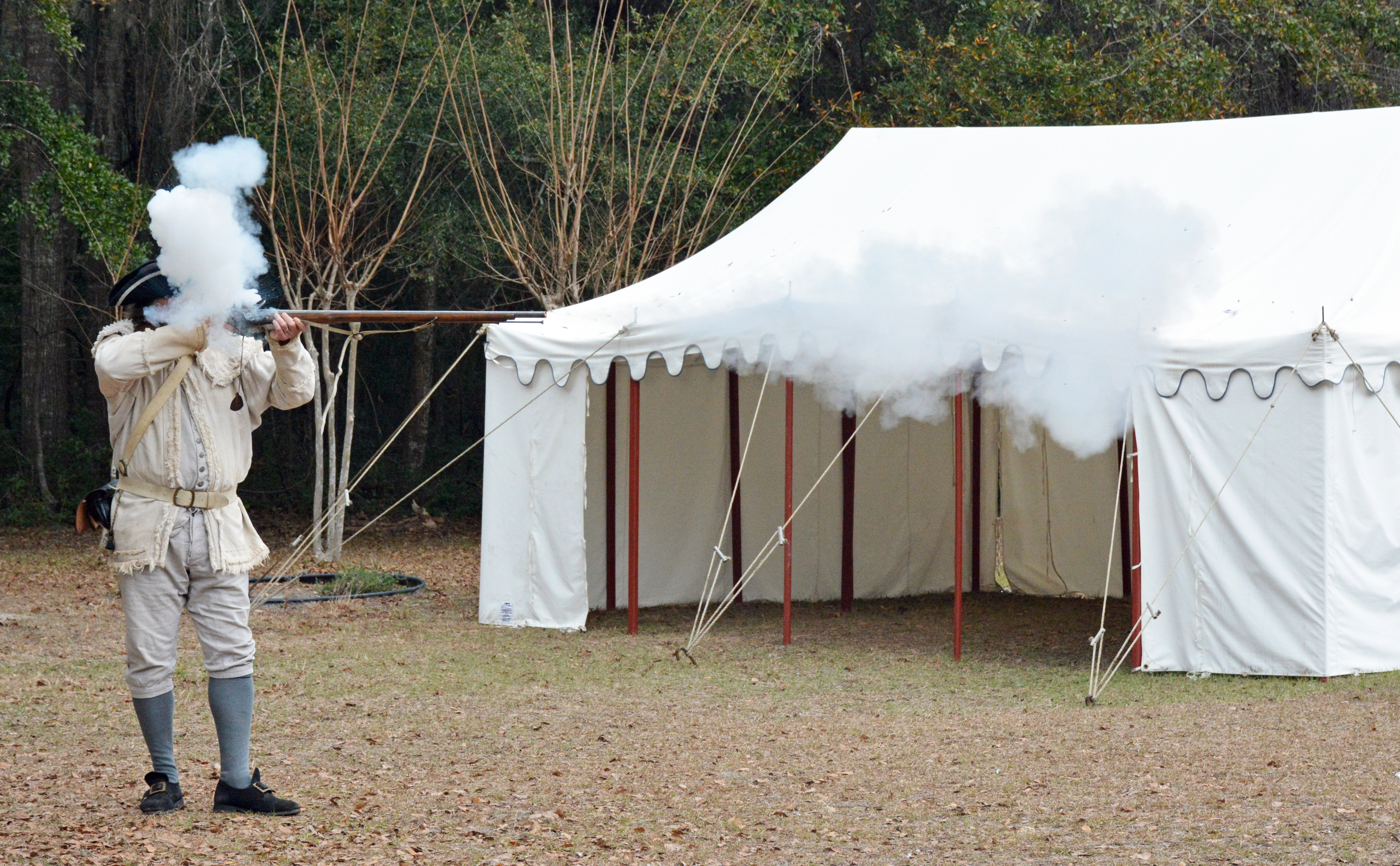
Musket demonstration

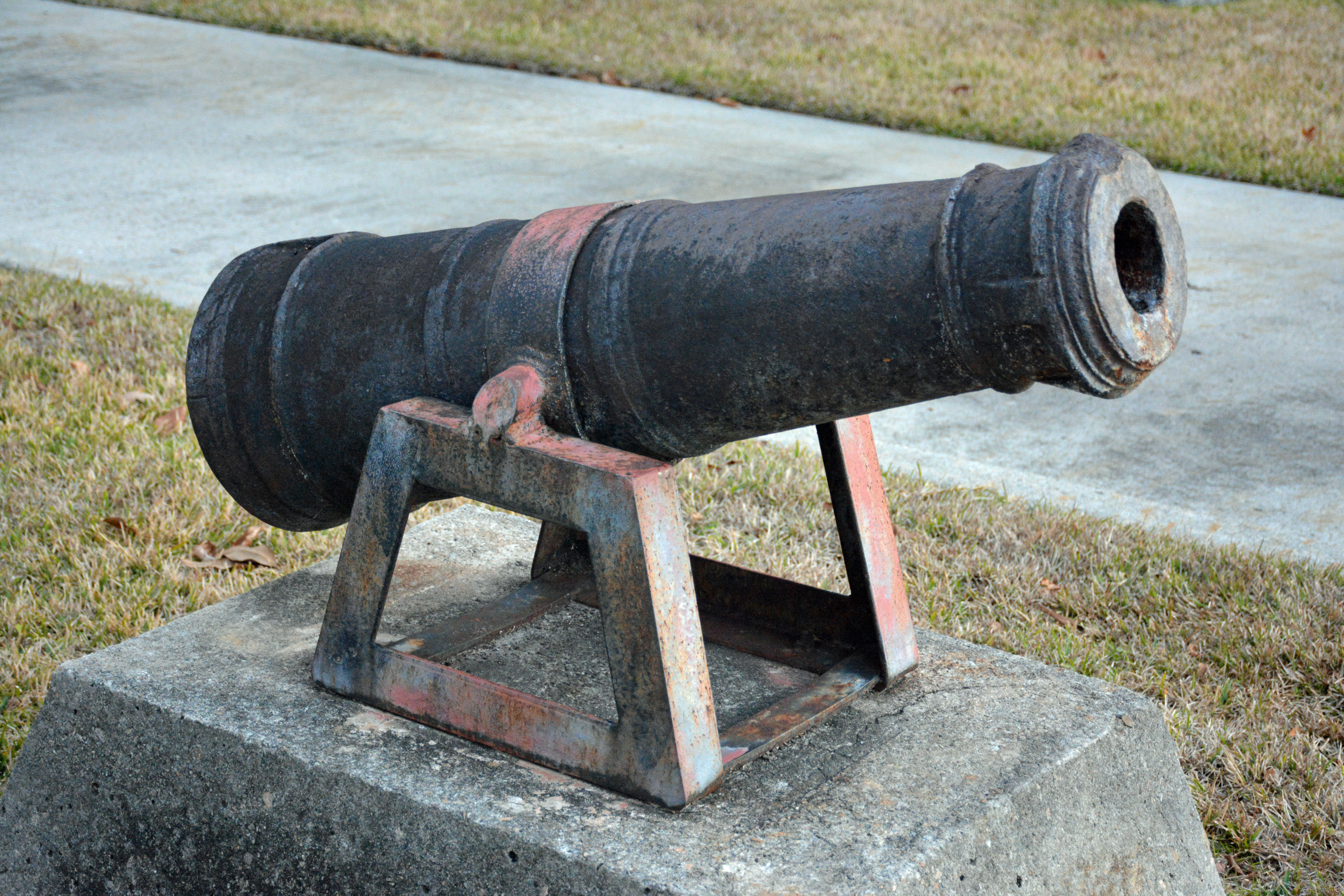
Cannon from Fort Morris on display at the Liberty County Courthouse

== See also ==
- Come and take it
- Fort Morris Historic Site
