= Stewart–Screven Monument =

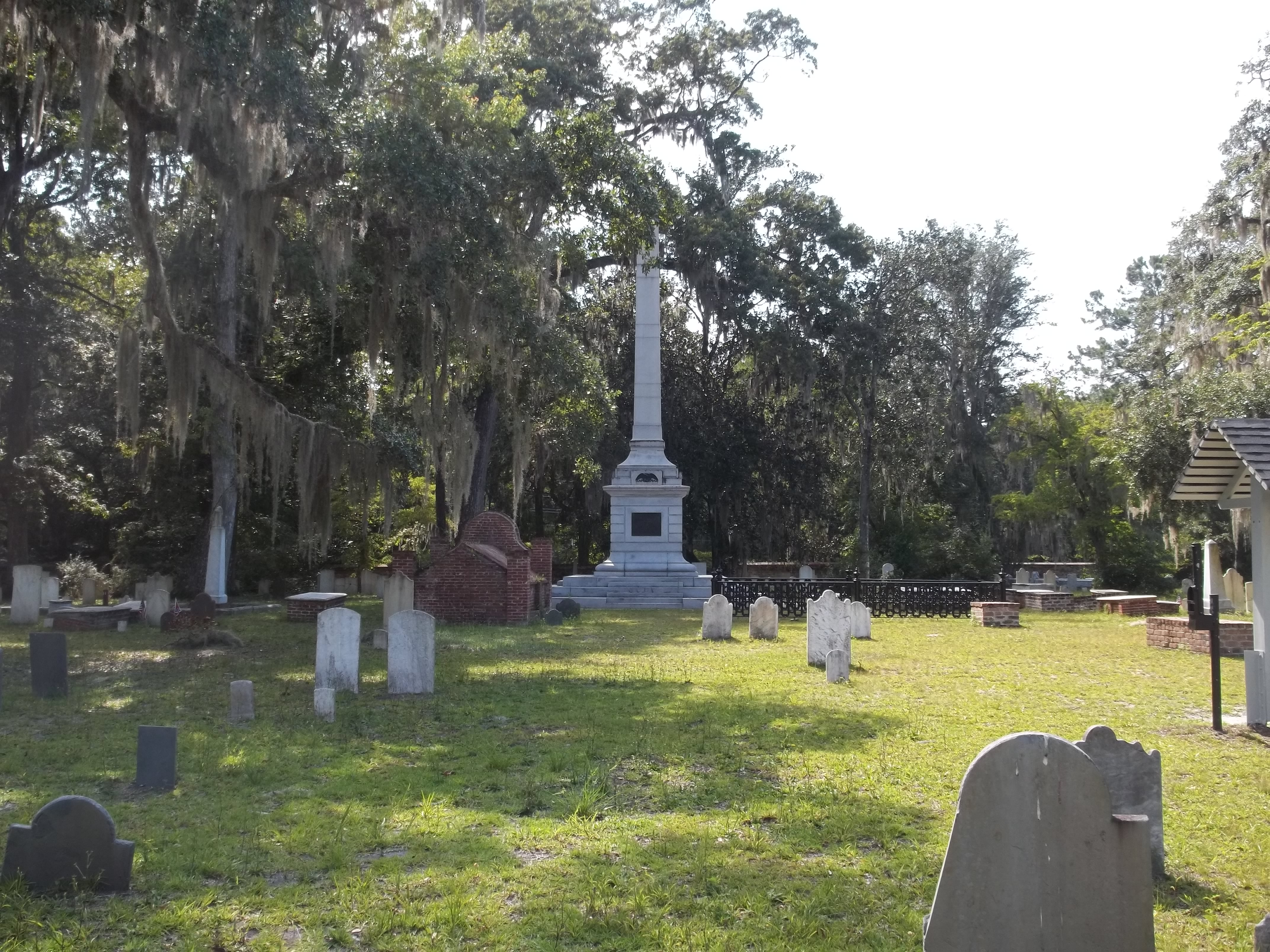
- Stewart–Screven Monument (2011)
- Interactive map of Stewart–Screven Monument
- Location: Midway Cemetery; Midway Historic District, Midway, Georgia, United States
- Coordinates: 31°48′21″N 81°25′53″W
- Builder: McNeel Marble Company
- Material: Marble
- Height: 50 feet (15 m)
- Dedicated date: April 26, 1915
- Dedicated to: Daniel Stewart and James Screven

The Stewart–Screven Monument is a monument in Midway Cemetery in Midway, Georgia, United States. Erected in 1915, the monument honors Daniel Stewart and James Screven, two generals from the American Revolutionary War. The cemetery is in the Midway Historic District.

== History ==
=== Background ===
Midway, Georgia, was established in 1752. During the American Revolution, the area around Midway became a hotspot of Patriot activity, and Lyman Hall, who served as a delegate from Georgia in the Continental Congress, was from Midway. During the reorganization of the state of Georgia during the American Revolutionary War, the county that Midway was in was named Liberty County in recognition of this. Midway was also the home of two noted soldiers who served as generals in the Continental Army during the war: James Screven and Daniel Stewart. In November 1778, Screven was mortally wounded during military action in Midway. Both Stewart and Screven would later receive multiple honors due to their involvement in the war, including serving as the namesakes for several places in Georgia, such as Fort Screven, Fort Stewart, Screven County, and Stewart County.

=== Erection and dedication ===
In 1910, the United States Congress passed an act appropriating $10,000 towards the erection of a monument honoring both Screven and Stewart in Midway. The push to erect a monument to honor the two had been championed by Willian Neyle Colquitt, a prominent citizen of Savannah, Georgia who, after the act was passed, was made secretary of the commission to erect the monument. Other members of the commission included U.S. Senator Augustus O. Bacon, U.S. Representative Charles G. Edwards, and ex-President of the United States Theodore Roosevelt as the honorary chairman. The monument was erected by the McNeel Marble Company. It was officially dedicated on April 26, 1915, with multiple military companies in attendance, including several troops from Fort Screven. The dedication ceremony was attended by about 5,000 spectators. Prior to its unveiling, it was covered by two large American flags. Both Roosevelt and then-President Woodrow Wilson sent letters that were read aloud during the ceremony.

== Design ==
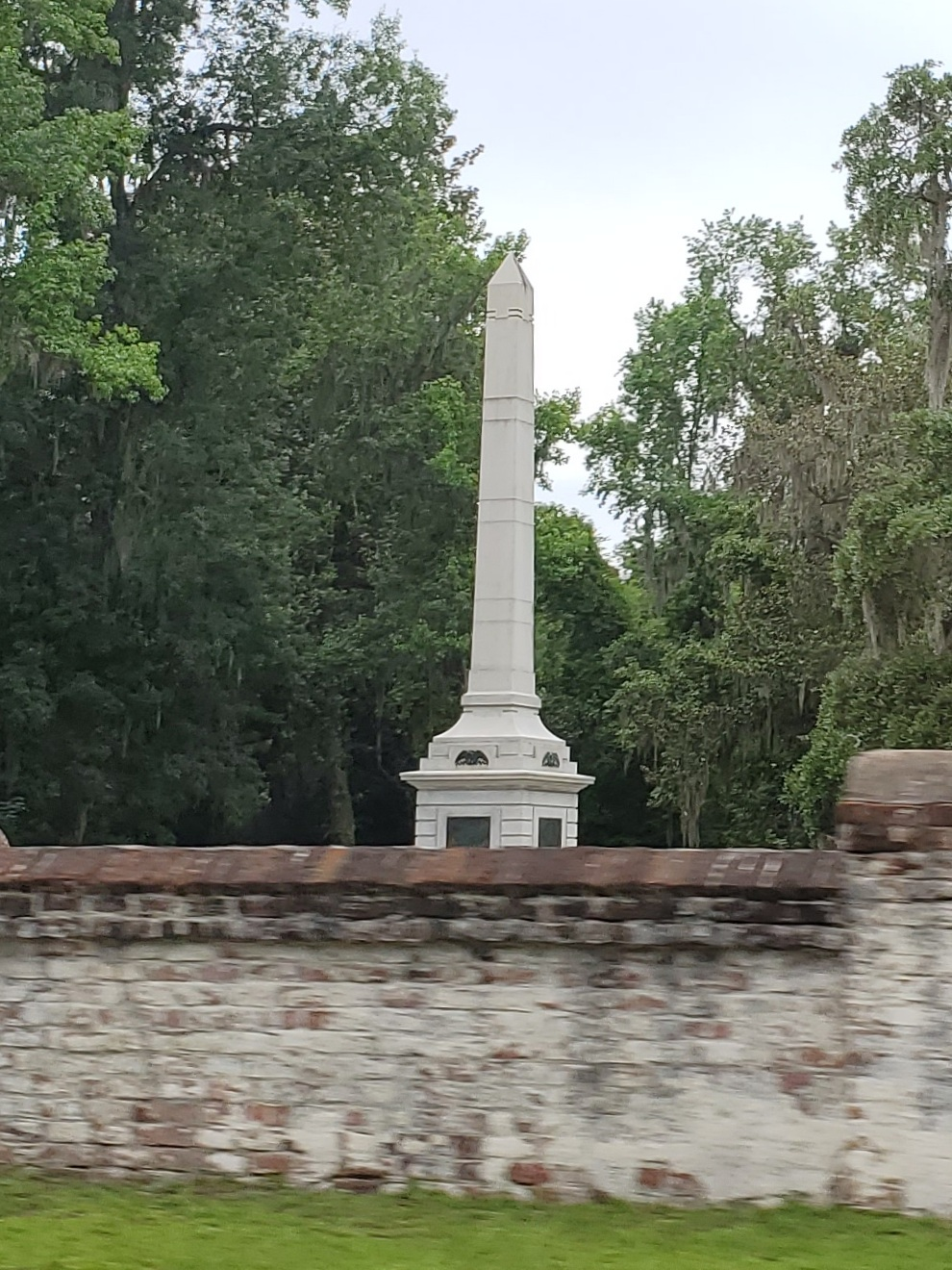
The monument in 2021

The monument is a large marble obelisk, rising to a height of 50 feet (15 m), with the base covering 30 square feet (2.8 m^{2}). It is located in the center of Midway Cemetery, near the Midway Congregational Church, and it is the tallest structure in the cemetery. Four copper plates adorn each face of the monument near its base, with the following inscriptions on them:

1750 1778
Sacred to the Memory of BRIGADIER-GENERAL
JAMES SCREVEN, who Fell, Covered with Wounds
at Sunbury, Near this Spot, on the 22nd Day of Novem-
ber, 1778. He Died on the 24th Day of November, 1778,
from the Effects of his Wounds.

— (North face)

Reared by the Congress of the United States as a
Nation's Tribute to BRIGADIER-GENERALS JAMES
SCREVEN and DANIEL STEWART.

— (East face)

1759 1829
Sacred to the Memory of BRIGADIER-GENERAL
DANIEL STEWART, a Gallant Soldier in the Revolu-
tion and an Officer Brevetted for Bravery in the Indian
Wars.

— (South face)

The plate on the west face of the monument bears no text and instead depicts the Midway Church building.

== See also ==
- 1915 in art

== Bibliography ==
- Devendorf, Meredith R. (2009). Liberty County. Arcadia Publishing. ISBN 978-0-7385-6609-2 – via Google Books.
- Knight, Lucian Lamar (1913). Georgia's Landmarks, Memorials and Legends. Vol. I. Byrd Printing Company – via Google Books.
- The Georgia Society of the Colonial Dames of America (1924). Some Early Epitaphs in Georgia. The Seeman Printery – via Google Books.
