= John Jones (major) =

American aide-de-camp (1749–1779)

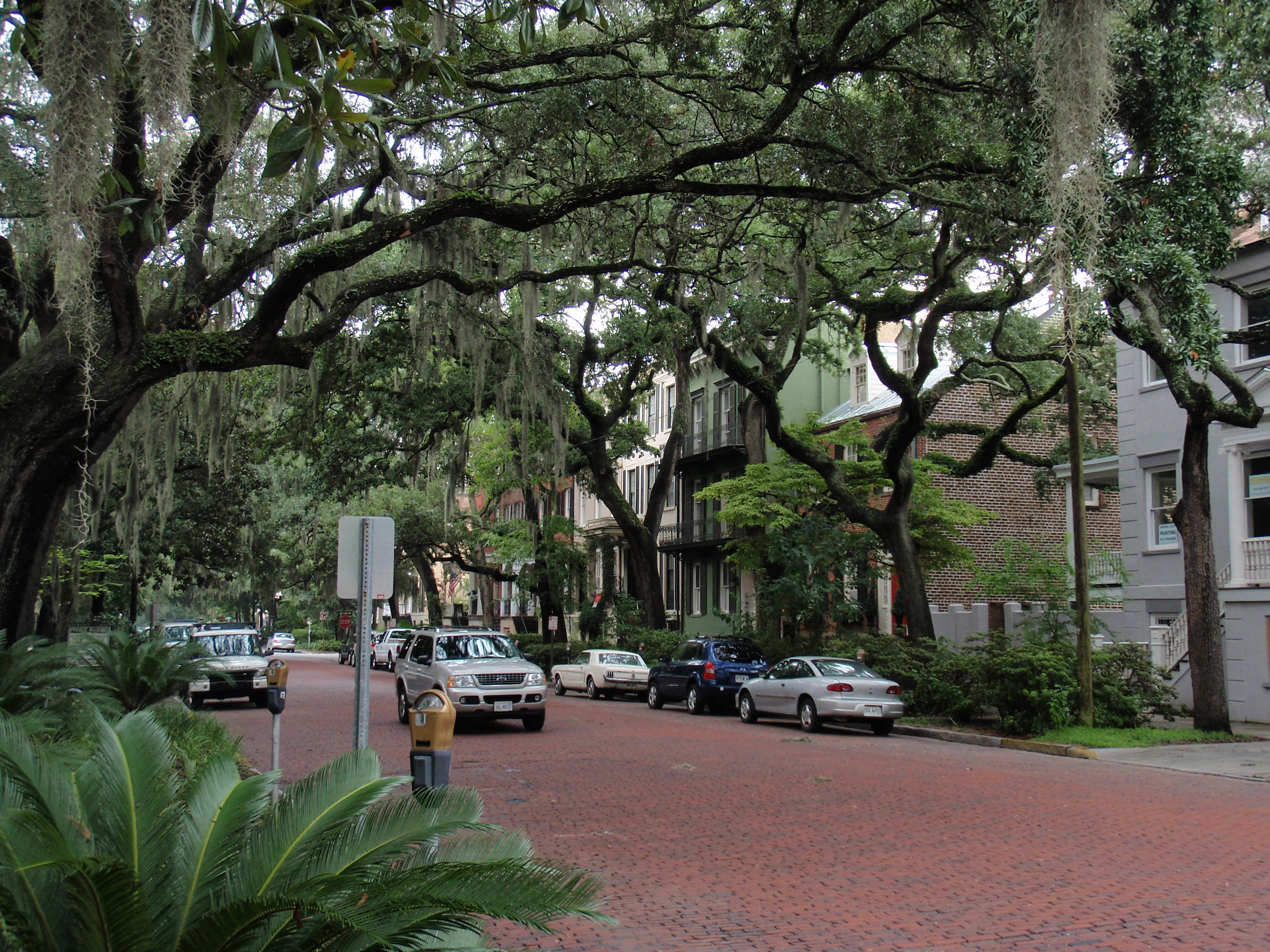
- Jones Street in Savannah, Georgia, is named in Jones's honor
- Born: John Letton Jones; January 20, 1749; Charleston, Province of South Carolina
- Died: October 9, 1779 (aged 30) Savannah, Georgia, U.S.
- Buried: Midway Cemetery, Midway, Georgia, U.S.
- Allegiance: Kingdom of Great Britain; United States of America
- Branch: Continental Army
- Rank: Major
- Conflicts: American Revolutionary War; Siege of Savannah †

John Letton Jones (January 20, 1749 – October 9, 1779) was a major in the Continental Army during the American Revolutionary War. He was aide-de-camp to general William Howe and brigadier general Lachlan McIntosh.

He was killed in the 1779 siege of Savannah. Jones Street, in Savannah, Georgia, is now named for him.

== Early life ==
Jones was born to Joseph Lewis Jones and Mary Taliaferro in Charleston, Province of South Carolina, in 1749.

== Personal life ==
He married Mary Sharpe, daughter of James Sharpe and Mary Newton, on December 28, 1769. The couple had five children: Mary (1770), John (1772), Millicent (1774), Hannah (1778) and Joseph (1779). One of his posthumous grandchildren was Charles Colcock Jones, son of John.

Jones moved to coastal Georgia in the 1770s, purchasing a plantation in St. John's Parish.

== Death ==
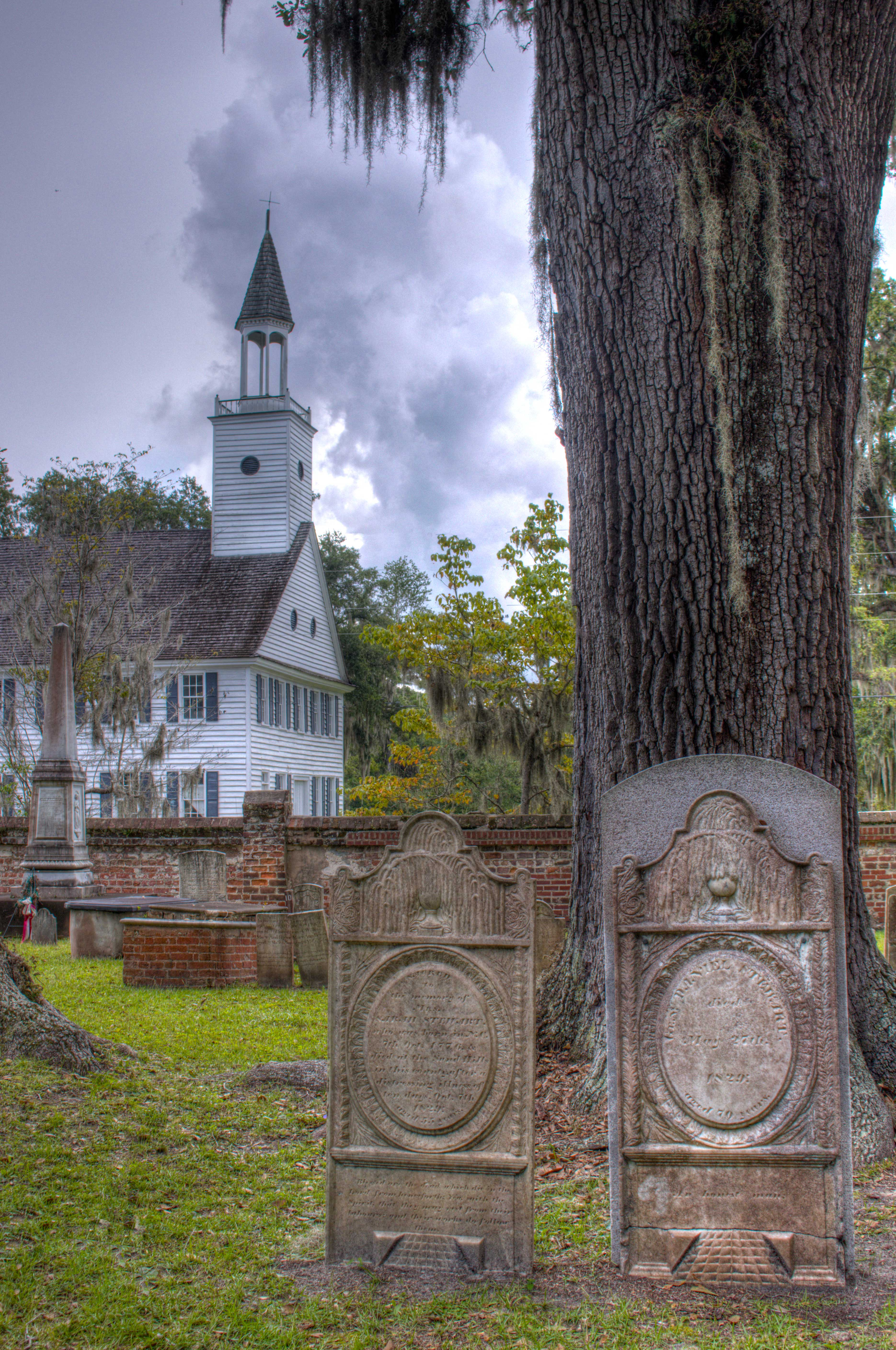
Jones's burial place, Midway Church in Midway, Georgia

Jones was killed on October 9, 1779, in Savannah, Georgia, during the city's siege. He was reportedly cut in two by a cannon shot during the assault on Spring Hill Redoubt (in today's Yamacraw Village). Aged 30, he was interred in Midway Cemetery in Midway, Georgia, around thirty miles southwest of Savannah. He had been living in nearby Sunbury.

His wife remarried, to major Philip Low.
