= James Screven =

Brigadier general during the American Revolutionary War

- Born: 1744; James Island, Province of South Carolina, colonial America
- Died: November 24, 1778 (aged 33–34); Midway, Georgia, U.S.
- Cause of death: Killed in action
- Resting place: Midway Cemetery, Midway, Georgia, U.S.

James Screven (1744 – November 24, 1778) was a brigadier general in the Continental Army during the American Revolutionary War. He was killed in action, having died from wounds received during battle.

Fort Screven, on Tybee Island, is named for him, as is Screven County, Georgia, and (formerly) the SS James Screven.

== Early life ==
Screven was born on James Island, Province of South Carolina, in 1744 to James Screven and Mary Hyrne Smith. Charles's great-grandfather, the Reverend William Screven, had been a Baptist minister in Kittery, Province of Maine, before moving to South Carolina.

He established a plantation, Screven's Hill, just to the north of today's Midway Congregational Church in Midway, Georgia.

== Political career ==
Screven was a member of the Provincial Congress of Georgia which met in Savannah on July 4, 1775. He was then a member of St. John's Parish.

== Military career ==
In 1776, Screven was commissioned, by the Georgia Legislature, captain of St. John's Rangers, a new company of volunteer militia who lived in the area of Midway and Sunbury, Georgia. His younger brother, John, served as lieutenant.

=== Battle of Alligator Creek Bridge ===
On June 30, 1778, general Robert Howe sent a force of 100 cavalry under Screven to near present-day Callahan, Florida, to locate loyalist Thomas Brown. Brown ordered a company of men to circle around behind them while the rest of his men hid along the road heading south from the fort. The men Brown sent to flank the Continentals were betrayed by deserters and ambushed, with most of them captured or killed. Brown began moving down the road toward the Alligator Bridge, but was overtaken by Screven's company shortly before he got there. As a result, Brown's men were chased directly into the established British position at the bridge.

There was some initial confusion, because neither Screven's nor Brown's forces had regular uniforms, so the British regulars thought all of those arriving were Brown's men. This changed quickly however, and a firefight broke out. Prevost's regulars quickly took up positions and began firing on Screven's men, while some of Brown's men went around to come at their flank. In pitched battle, men on both sides went down, Screven was wounded, and some of the Patriot militia narrowly escaped being trapped before Screven ordered the retreat.

The next day, major Mark Prevost moved out with his, Brown's and Daniel McGirt's men, and surprised a Patriot crew repairing a bridge. Rather than extending themselves, they then decided to retreat, felling trees across the road as they went. The divisions in the American camps, however, meant that there would be no further advance. The Continental forces were out of rice and appealed to the Georgia militia for supplies. The militia finally crossed the Saint Marys on July 6, adding some strength to the Continental force, which had been reduced by disease and desertion to only 400 effective soldiers. The shortage of food and the ongoing command disagreements spelled the end of the expedition, which began its retreat on July 14. This effectively ended the idea in Georgia of gaining control of East Florida.

The site of the bridge has long been supposed to be in central Callahan, where a marker has been placed, but some historians believe that the actual site of the bridge was somewhat farther east.

On November 22, 1778, Screven's militia was ambushed by the East Florida Rangers, led by Brown, at Spencer's Hill, about 1.5 miles (2.4 km) south of Midway Church. Screven was shot several times and taken as prisoner. The church was burned by the British. Some historians claim that Screven's "brutal shooting" may have escalated the war in Georgia.

== Death ==
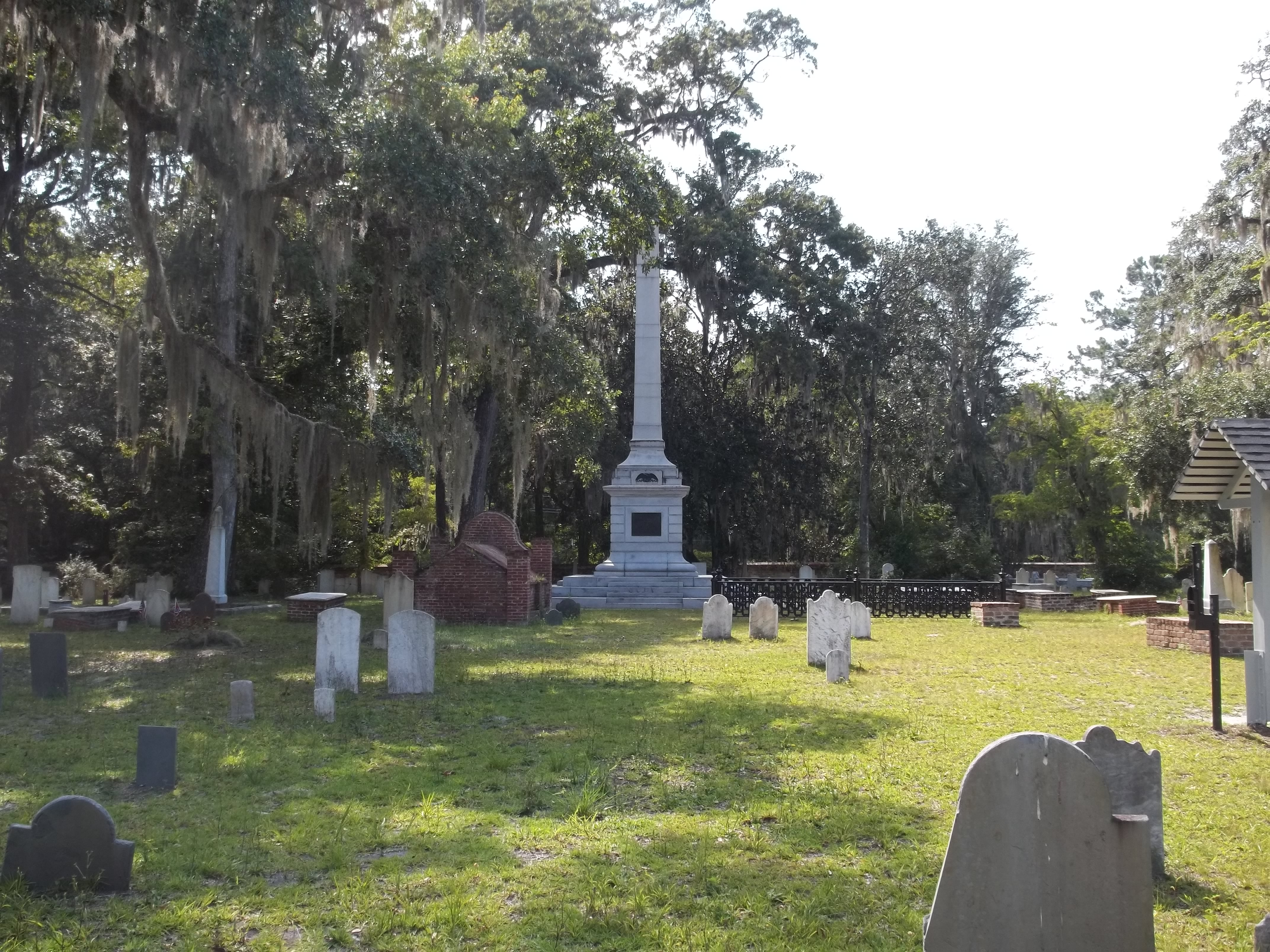
The Stewart–Screven Monument in Midway, Georgia

Screven died from his wounds in Midway on November 24, 1778, aged 34. Dr. James Dunwoody (1741–1809) was present when he died. Screven was interred in Midway Cemetery, alongside Daniel Stewart. Their burial location is marked by the Stewart–Screven Monument, which was erected by the United States Congress in 1915. The inscription on Screven's tombstone incorrectly states he was 28 years old at the time of his death.

=== Legacy ===
Fort Screven, on Tybee Island, is named for Screven, as is Screven County, Georgia, and (formerly) the SS James Screven.

== Personal life ==
In 1764, Screven married Mary Esther Odingsell, with whom he had at least five children. Charles Odingsell Screven (1774–1830) became a noted Baptist minister.
