= Benjamin Andrew =

American politician

Personal details
- Born: 1726 South Carolina, USA
- Died: December 16, 1790 (aged 64) Augusta, Georgia, USA
- Spouse(s): Elizabeth (1749–1753); Susannah Franklyn (1753–1762); Mary Philbin (1762–1787); Elizabeth Lee (1788–1790)
- Profession: Rice Planter; State Politician
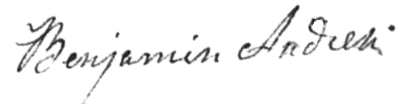
- Signature

Benjamin Andrew (c. 1726 – December 16, 1790) was an American rice planter, slave-owner, and state politician in the Royal Province of Georgia, and later, the State of Georgia. He became heavily involved in supporting the Patriot cause in the American Revolution and was closely associated with other patriotic Georgia leaders, like Noble W. Jones, Button Gwinnett, Archibald Bulloch and Lyman Hall.

== Early life ==
He was born in either Dorchester County, South Carolina, or Colleton County, South Carolina, around 1726. His father was John Andrew, who is believed to have come to South Carolina from the New England area around 1705. Benjamin was a member of the Dorchester Congregationalist Church, and relocated with that church when they elected to move, as an entire congregation with their Negro slaves, to Georgia in 1754.

The church established itself in Midway, Georgia, that year. The community cleared the marshes and became a thriving community of rice planters. They built Midway Congregational Church, which became the center of both religious and civil gatherings for the tight-knit community.

In 1769, Benjamin was elected to the royal provincial legislature (the Commons House of Assembly) of Georgia representing Midway and St. John's Parish (modern-day Liberty County). He served in the Commons through 1774.

In April 1773, the naturalist William Bartram visited Benjamin Andrew at his home in Midway and recorded the visit in his Travels book.

== American Revolution ==
On July 27, 1774, Benjamin Andrew was among those who responded to a notice in the local Georgia Gazette newspaper to meet at Tondee's Tavern in Savannah, Georgia, to discuss the political situation in the American colonies following the announcement of the “Intolerable Acts” and the closing of the port of Boston. Benjamin was appointed as one of 30 men to start Georgia's Committee of Correspondence.

Unable to persuade the rest of the Province of Georgia to join the other colonies in boycotting British goods (as called for by the 1st Continental Congress), Benjamin Andrew joined with other like-minded Patriots from St. John's Parish. They elected Dr. Lyman Hall to be their delegate to represent St. John's in the Continental Congress. Arriving in Philadelphia on May 13, 1775, Dr. Hall presented his credentials and was admitted as the delegate from St. John's Parish. Georgia finally joined the other colonies in sending delegates to the Continental Congress in July 1775.

In February 1776, Benjamin joined the Georgia Council of Safety. The Council of Safety had recently ousted the Royal Governor, Sir James Wright, who had fled to safety to a British warship off the Georgia coast. The Council of Safety became the de facto government of Georgia until a state constitution could be established. Benjamin became an active member of the Council. Shortly after he joined the Council occurred Georgia's first armed conflict with the British, the "Battle of the Rice Boats" in Savannah harbor. After a small fight with the Americans, the British were successful in commandeering and sailing off with some of the rice cargo vessels. This incident galvanized the Council to begin fortifying Savannah and Sunbury, raising troops, and accumulating stores of ammunition for the defense of Georgia.

In May 1777, Georgia adopted its first state Constitution. John Adam Treutlen was elected Governor of Georgia. Benjamin Andrew was chosen president of the new Executive Council, which was the equivalent of a modern-day Lieutenant Governor. The primary concerns of the new state government for the next two years were possible British incursions from British Florida as well as problems with the Creek Indians on Georgia's western frontier.

In November 1778, British and Loyalist units from St. Augustine, Florida, conducted a raid in the Midway and Sunbury areas prior to the main British assault on Savannah in December. Benjamin, his family, and many others fled the region to South Carolina. The Midway Church was burned by the British. One month later, the British captured Savannah (December 1778). The British were able to restore the Royal government in Savannah and the surrounding areas by March 1779. What was left of the Georgia Patriot government retreated to Wilkes County in northern Georgia but was unable to govern effectively for the next three years. Benjamin Andrew and his family spent the next three years living as refugees in parts of South Carolina and Wilkes County.

In January 1780, Benjamin Andrew attended a short-lived meeting of the state (Patriot) General Assembly in Augusta, Georgia. He was elected to represent Georgia in the Second Continental Congress but was not able to travel to Philadelphia to take his seat.

Later that year, in May 1780, the reinstated Royal Government of Georgia retaliated against the Georgia Patriots' confiscation of Loyalist estates in 1778 by passing the High Treason and Disqualification Acts, also known as the Retaliatory Acts. These acts seized the property of prominent Georgia Patriots and disqualified them from ever holding public office in Georgia. Benjamin Andrew's name is one of 151 names that appear on the Disqualification Act. His property was consequently seized by the Royal government.

Most of Georgia was in a very weaken and lawless state from 1779 to 1781, as the Royal government could only effectively control the area around Savannah. The Americans were able to take back Augusta from the Loyalists in June 1781. With the American victory at Yorktown in October 1781, American fortunes began to rise, and Georgia leaders were able to begin rebuilding a state government.

State elections were held in January 1782, and Benjamin Andrew was again elected to office, representing Liberty County, and then elected to serve on the Executive Council. John Martin was elected as Governor of Georgia.

The British evacuated Savannah on July 11, 1782 and the exiled Georgia state government was able to resume their meetings in Savannah.

== Latter life ==
Benjamin Andrew continued to be a representative in the Georgia Legislature from 1782 through 1786, representing Liberty County. He also served as one of three Superior Court judges in Liberty County, along with George Walton. In 1787, he decided to leave Liberty County and purchased land in Richmond County, Georgia, near Augusta, and moved there with his family and Negro slaves. In October 1790, Benjamin was again elected to the state legislature as a representative for Richmond County. The Legislature met in November 1790 in Augusta and adjourned on 11 Dec 1790. Benjamin Andrew died five days later, on 16 December, in Augusta.

== Personal life ==
Benjamin Andrew was married four times. His first wife, Elizabeth, died shortly after the birth of their second son in 1753. Both boys lived to adulthood.

He married his second wife, Susanna Franklyn, in 1753. Together they had five children, but only one child, a daughter, survived infancy to live to adulthood. Susanna died in 1762. Such death of children and young mothers was common in the tidewater area of Georgia during this period. This has been attributed to the malarial-like conditions that existed around the rice plantations, either due to malaria or yellow-fever.

Later in 1762, Benjamin married Mary Philbin. They had four daughters, of which three survived to adulthood. Mary died in January 1787.

He married for the last (fourth) time in 1788, Elizabeth Few Lee, a recent widow with five young children and 25 years his junior. Elizabeth was the sister of William Few, signer of the US Constitution for the state of Georgia. They had one boy and one girl. The boy, Moses Andrew, became a famous physician and Methodist preacher in Montgomery, Alabama. Elizabeth survived him and remarried for her third time Thomas Bush.

== Sources ==
- Candler, Allen D. (1908). The Revolutionary Records of the State of Georgia ("RRG"). Atlanta, GA: Franklin Printing and Publishing., 3 vols.
