= John Elliott (Georgia politician) =

American politician

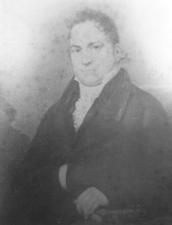

United States Senator from Georgia
- In office March 4, 1819 – March 3, 1825
- Preceded by: Charles Tait
- Succeeded by: John M. Berrien

Personal details
- Born: October 24, 1773 Liberty County, Georgia
- Died: August 9, 1827 (aged 53) Sunbury, Georgia, buried in Midway Cemetery, Midway, Georgia
- Party: Democratic-Republican
- Spouses: Esther Dunwoody (m. 1795, divorced) Martha Stewart Bulloch Sr. (m. 1818)
- Children: Hester Amarintha Elliott; Corinne Elliott; Susan Ann Elliott; Georgia Amanda Elliott; Charles William Elliott; Daniel Stewart Elliott

John Elliott (October 24, 1773 – August 9, 1827) was a United States senator from Georgia, serving from 1819 to 1825.

Elliott graduated from Yale University in 1794 and returned to Georgia to practice law. He was elected to the Senate after holding several local offices.

Through his first wife Esther Dunwoody, he was the father of Hester Amarintha "Hettie" Elliott (1797–1831) and Corinne Elliott. Hettie was the first wife of Major James Stephens Bulloch (1793–1849) and mother of Civil War Confederate veteran James Dunwoody Bulloch (1823–1901).

Senator Elliott was also the first husband of Martha "Patsy" Stewart (1799–1864), daughter of General Daniel Stewart and Sarah Susannah Oswald. John and Patsy had four children:

- Susan Ann Elliott (1820–1895)
- Georgia Amanda Elliott (1822–1848)
- Charles William Elliott (September 1824 – c. 1825)
- Daniel Stewart "Dan" Elliott (1826–1861), Civil War Confederate casualty

In 1820, he enslaved 115 people in Liberty County, Georgia. In 1830, his estate enslaved 117 people.

Around a year before Elliott's death, Isaiah Davenport built him a home at 204 East State Street in Savannah, Georgia. Later known as the Elliott–Huger House, it was demolished in 1932.

Elliott died in 1827, aged 53. He was interred in Midway Cemetery in Midway, Georgia.

After his death, Patsy married his son-in-law Major Bulloch on May 8, 1832, and had four children, including Martha "Mittie" Bulloch (1835–1884) and Civil War Confederate veteran Irvine Stephens Bulloch (1842–1898). Mittie was the mother of US President Theodore Roosevelt (1858–1919) and Elliott Roosevelt (1860–1894), who was the father of First Lady Anna Eleanor Roosevelt (1884–1962).

U.S. Senate
Preceded by Charles Tait	U.S. senator (Class 3) from Georgia; 1819–1825; Served alongside: Freeman Walker, Nicholas Ware, Thomas W. Cobb	Succeeded by John M. Berrien
