= Midway Historic District (Midway, Georgia) =

Historic church in Georgia, United States

- U.S. National Register of Historic Places
- U.S. Historic district
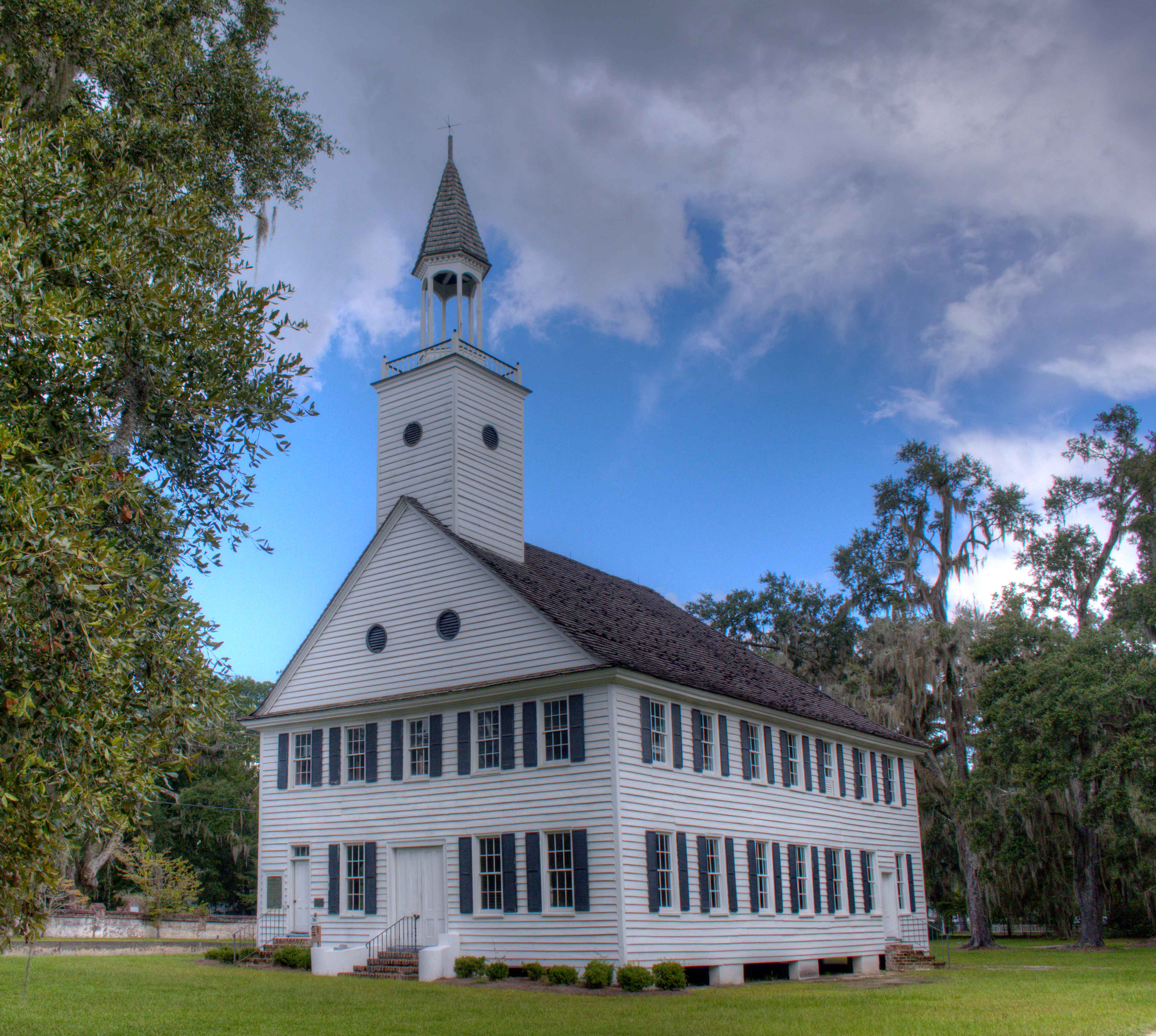
- Midway Congregational Church

- Location within Georgia Location within the United States
- Location: Jct. U.S. 17 and Martin Road, Midway, Georgia
- Area: 20 acres (8.1 ha)
- NRHP reference No.: 73000625
- Added to NRHP: March 1, 1973

The Midway Historic District consists of 20 acres (8.1 ha) encompassing the Midway Congregational Church, Midway Cemetery, the Midway Museum and the Old Sunbury Road, at the intersection of U.S. 17 and Martin Road (which was GA 38 when nominated) in Midway, Liberty County, Georgia. The Midway Congregational Church is a large historic wooden church built in 1792 to replace an earlier church building that had been burned by the British during the Revolutionary War. Its historic cemetery also dates from the 18th century. Notable Georgians buried in it include Governor and Congressman Nathan Brownson and early U.S. Senator John Elliott. It also contains the Stewart–Screven Monument, honoring two generals from the Continental Army. The Midway Museum is housed in a modern reconstruction of a typical 18th century raised cottage such as those that once existed in the area. The Old Sunbury Road section (now Martin Road) that runs past the district is a remnant of the road built during the early years of Georgia's statehood. On March 1, 1973, the Midway Historic District was added to the National Register of Historic Places.

== Photos ==
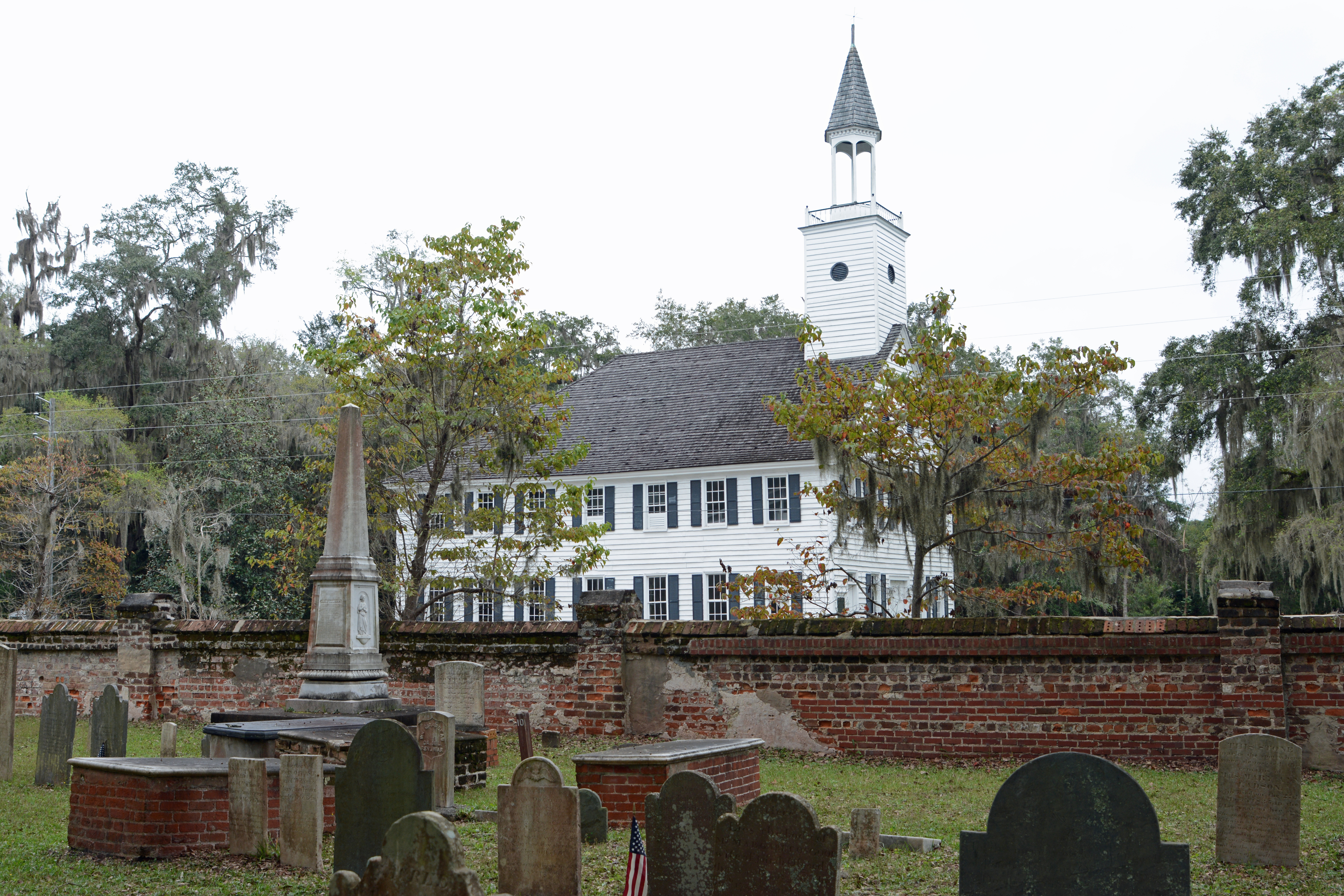
Midway Cemetery with church

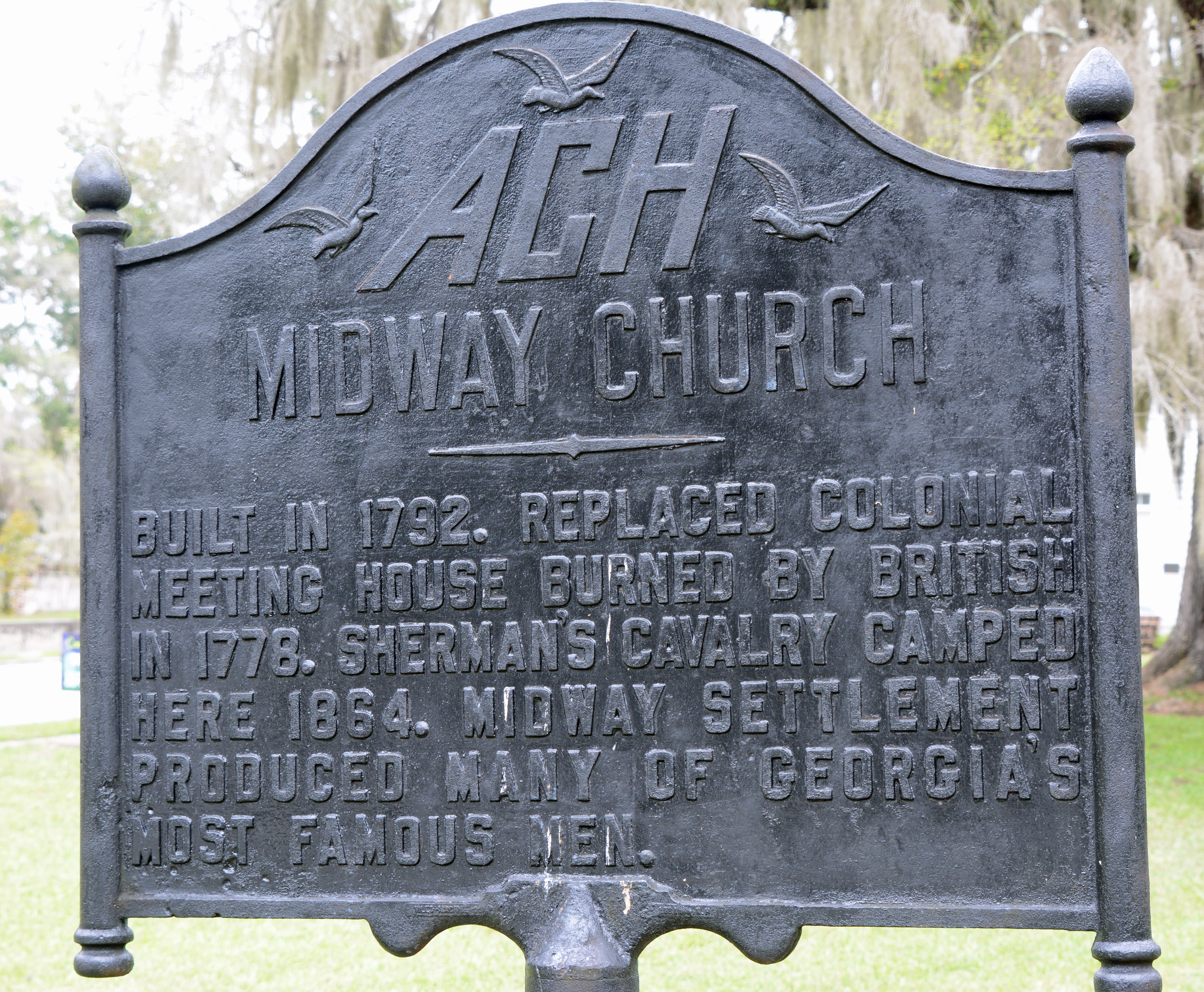
Marker for Midway Church

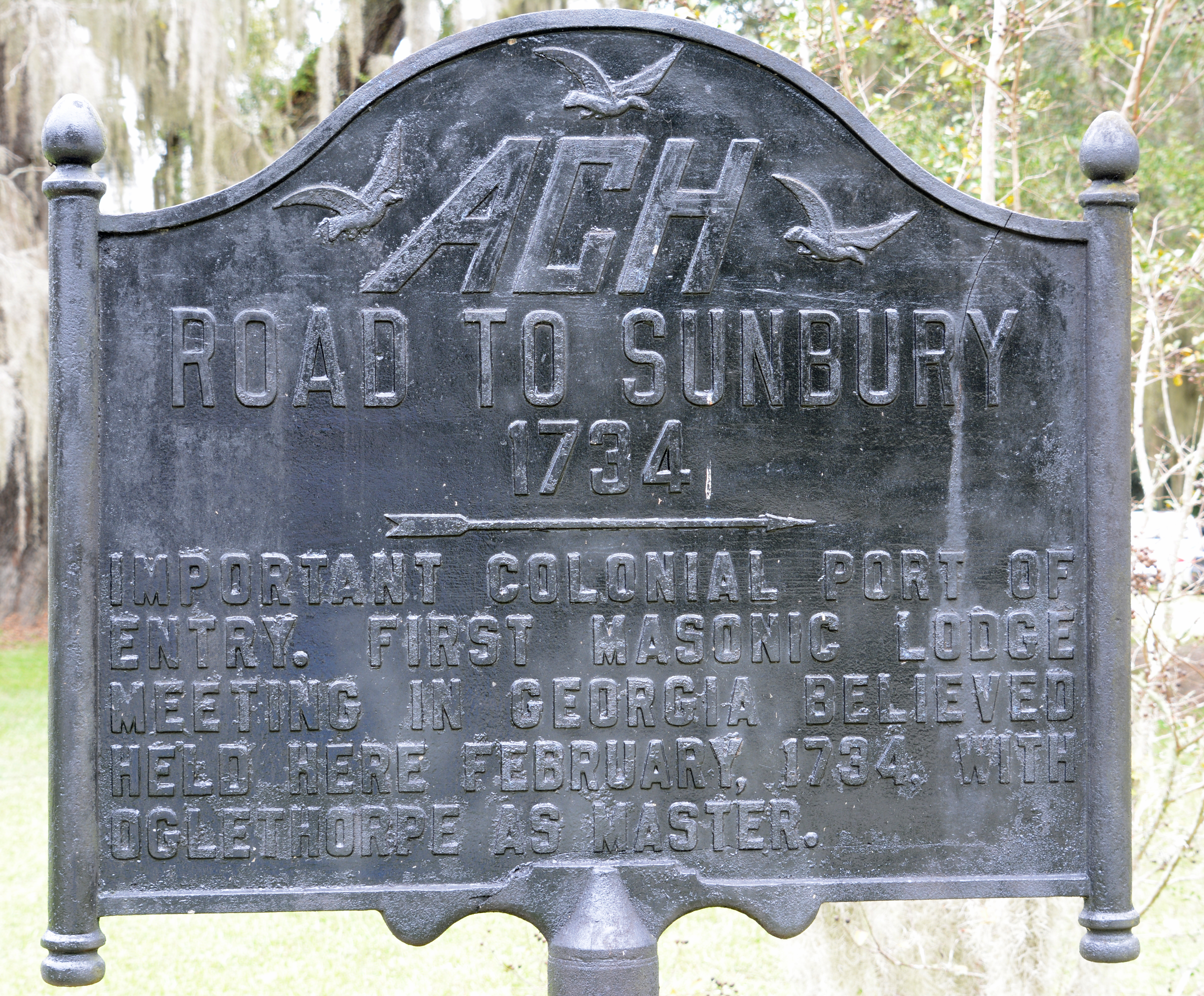
Marker for Sunbury Road

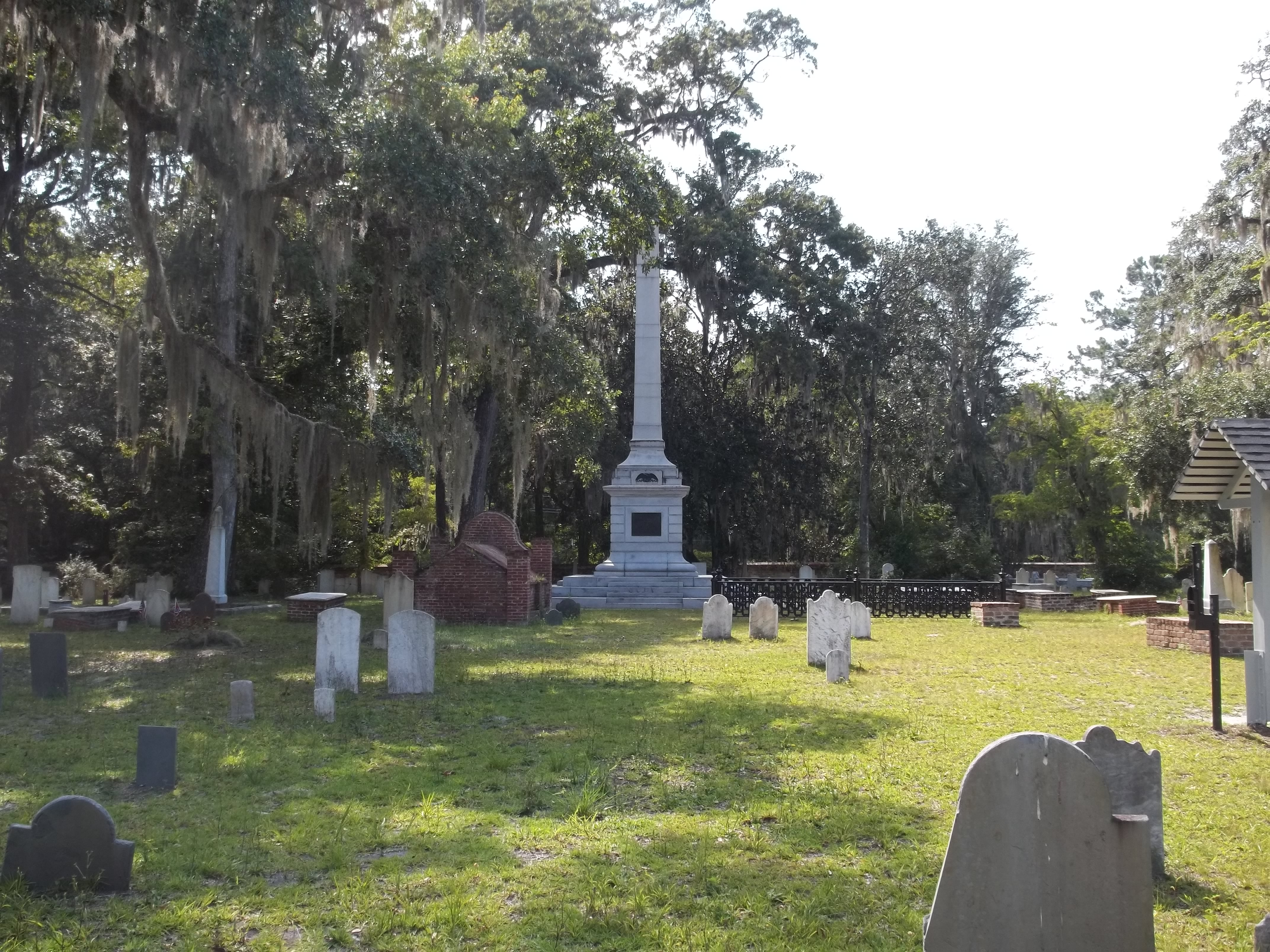
Midway Cemetery, with Stewart–Screven Monument

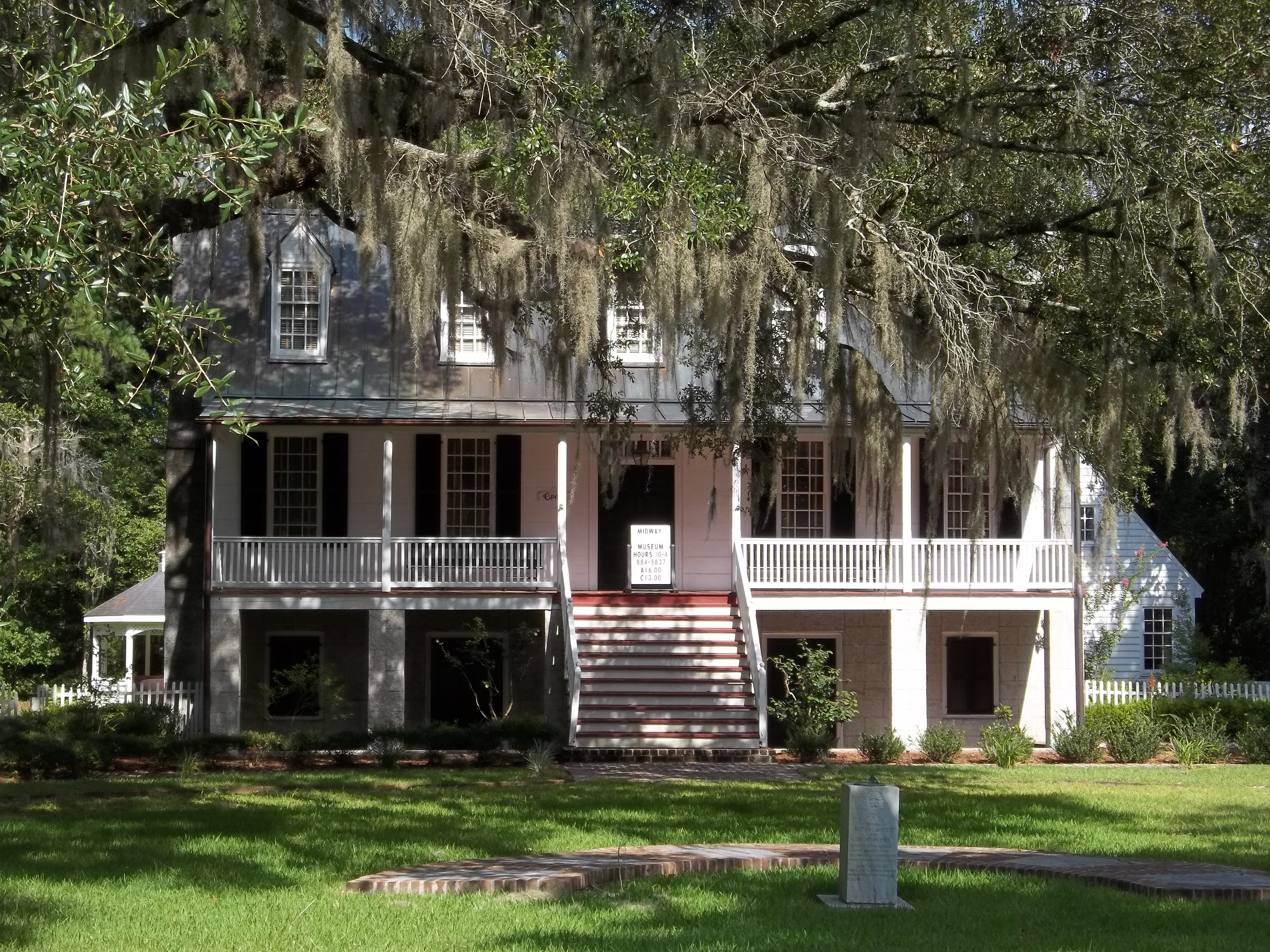
Midway Museum

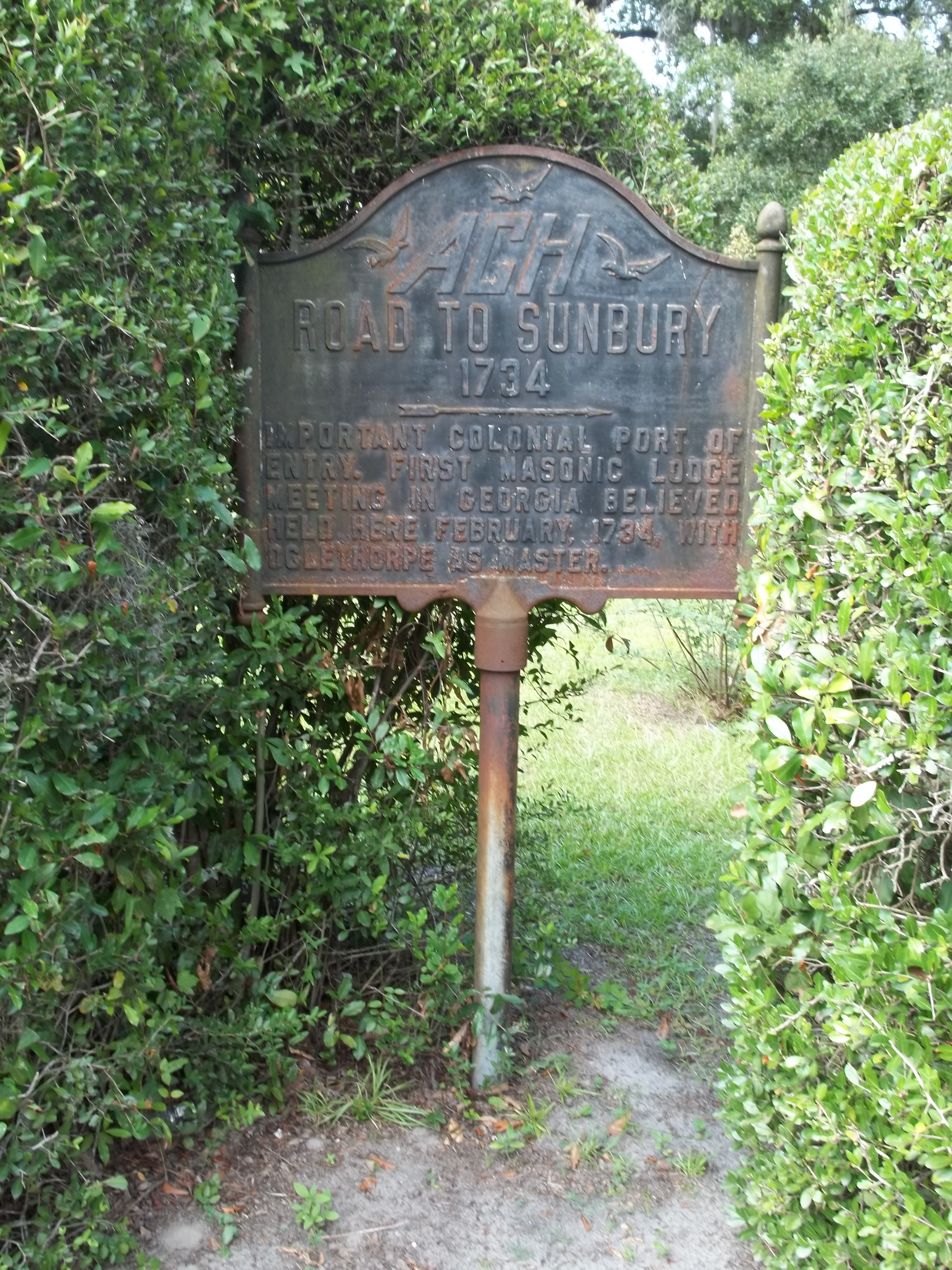
Old Sunbury Road marker
