= 103rd Intelligence and Electronic Warfare Battalion =

103rd Military Intelligence Battalion
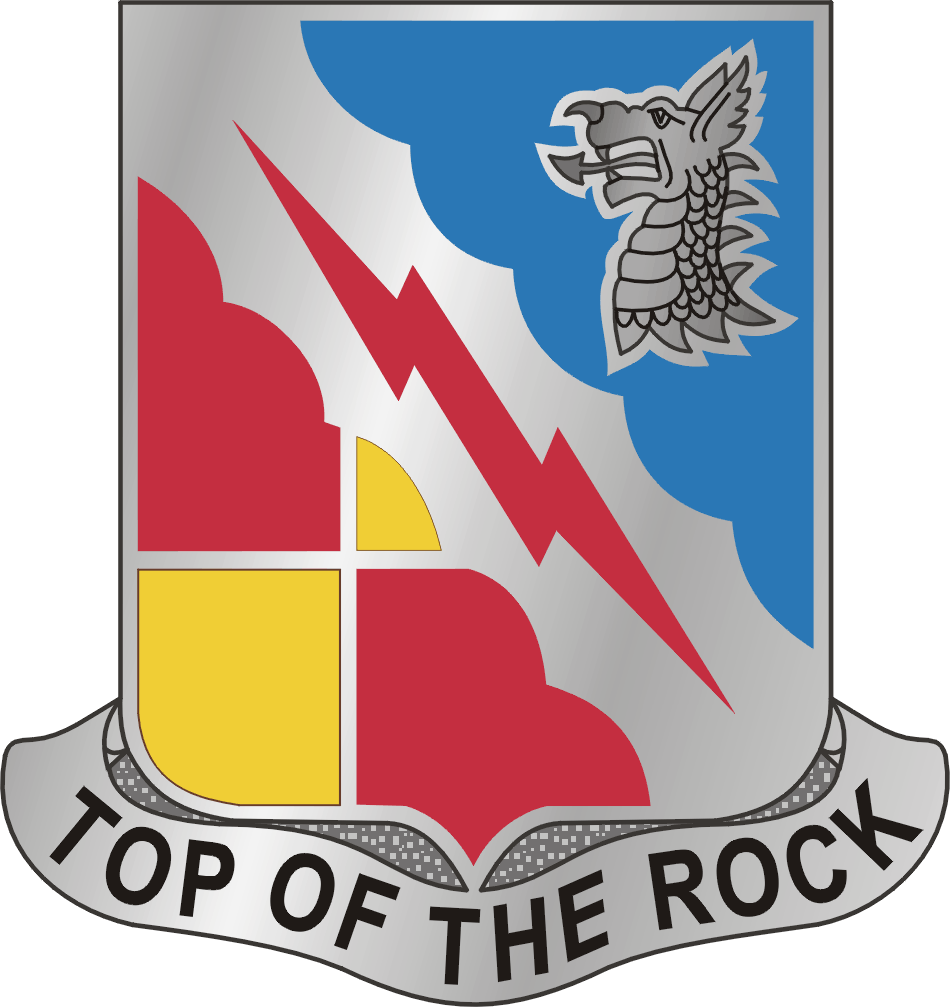
- Distinctive unit insignia
- Active: 1981-2004; 2022-present
- Country: United States
- Branch: United States Army
- Type: Military intelligence; Electronic warfare
- Role: Division support
- Size: Battalion
- Garrison/HQ: Fort Stewart, Georgia
- Nickname(s): "Dagger Battalion"
- Motto(s): Top of the Rock
- Engagements: World War II; Korean War; Iraqi Freedom

The 103rd Intelligence and Electronic Warfare Battalion (103rd IEW Battalion) is a United States Army military intelligence and electronic warfare battalion which serves as a direct subordinate unit to the 3rd Infantry Division. It was reactivated September 16, 2022, after an 18-year hiatus resulting from the elimination of all division level intelligence units.

== Organization ==
The battalion was organized with a Headquarters, and Headquarters Operation Company (HHOC). The Division's Analysis and Control Element (ACE), which provides direct support to the Division G2 (Intelligence Directorate), was also part of the HHOC. The Battalion had three direct-support companies (A, B, and C) that were habitually aligned to each of the maneuver brigades; for instance C Company was habitually assigned to 3rd Brigade, and a General Support Company (D) that provided support across the entire Division's operational area.

== History ==
The battalion was activated in Germany and designated as the 103rd Military Intelligence Battalion on 16 September 1981, after the U.S. Army directed the merger of the 851st Army Security Agency Company, and the 3rd Military Intelligence Company. As such, the 103rd Military Intelligence Battalion draws its lineage and honors from these two historical units. In the summer of 1996 the Battalion along with the 3rd Infantry Division (Mechanized), relocated to Fort Stewart, Georgia.

The 851st Army Security Agency Company was originally formed as the 3377th Signal Service Detachment which was activated in January 1945 on Luzon in the Philippines. In October 1951 the 851st Communications Reconnaissance Detachment, participating in four Korean War campaigns, including the first United Nations counteroffensive. The detachment was deactivated in Japan in August 1956. That same year it was briefly reactivated as the 851st Army Security Agency Detachment. It was finally designated the 851st Army Security Agency Company and reactivated in July 1974.

The 3rd Military Intelligence Company was activated in France in September 1944 as the 3rd Counterintelligence Corps. It was inactivated 2 years later after having participated in four World War II campaigns, including Rhineland and Ardennes-Alsace. In 1949, the detachment was reactivated and served in the Korean War. It participated in 8 campaigns including the Chinese Communist Force Intervention and the second and third Korean Winters. During January 1958, the detachment was reorganized and redesignated as the 3rd Military Intelligence detachment and attached to the 3rd Infantry Division. The detachment was assigned to the 3rd Infantry Division in April 1974.

== Operation Iraqi Freedom I (OIF-I) ==
The 103rd Military Intelligence Battalion, as part of the 3rd Infantry Division participated in the first iteration of Operation Iraqi Freedom. At the orders of the President of the United States, the 3rd Infantry Division already had a Brigade-sized element in Kuwait for a year prior to the start of the war and Company B, 103rd MI BN was part of that Brigade. In late summer/early fall of 2002, the 103rd MI BN sent more forces into Kuwait in anticipation of combat operations. By 27 January the entire Battalion was on the ground and conducting intelligence operations. The Battalion, equipped with the AN/MLQ 40 PROPHET system, began collecting signals intelligence on the Iraqi Forces. On 20 March 2003, the Battalion joined the Division in the attack with its direct support companies (A, B, C) providing support to each of the 3rd Infantry Division Brigade Combat Teams, and Company D, and HHOC providing support to the Division as a whole. The Battalion would participate in a number of operations including seizing OBJ LION (Saddam International Airport), and follow-on operations to Fallujah, Iraq before redeploying in Aug 2003.

== List of commanders ==
No.	Commander		Term	
No.	Portrait	Name	Took office	Left office
1	Robert J. Taylor	Lieutenant Colonel; Robert J. Taylor	2002	2004
2	Marcus O'Neal	Lieutenant Colonel; Marcus O'Neal	2022	
