= USS Shaula =

Liberty ship of WWII

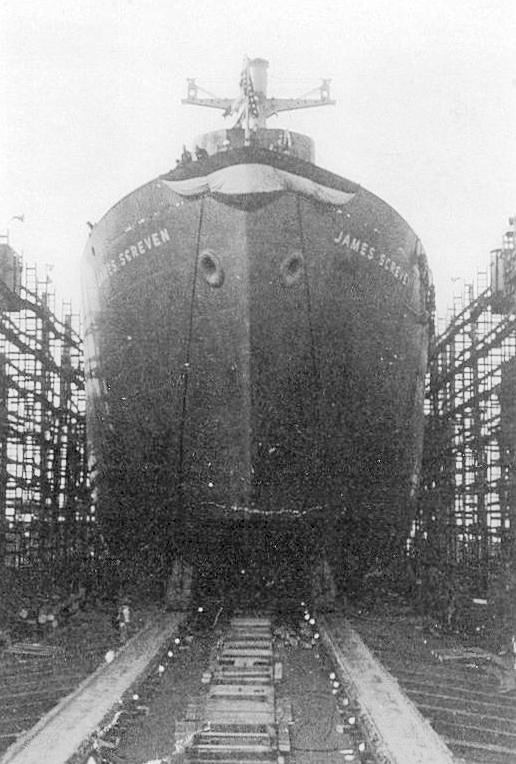
- SS James Screven launching, 23 November 1943, at St. Johns River Shipbuilding Corp., Jacksonville, FL.

History

United States
- Name: James Screven
- Namesake: James Screven
- Owner: War Shipping Administration (WSA)
- Ordered: as a type (EC2-S-C1) hull, MC hull 1213
- Awarded: 4 March 1942
- Builder: St. Johns River Shipbuilding Company, Jacksonville, Florida
- Cost: $1,342,750
- Yard number: 21
- Way number: 3
- Laid down: 4 October 1943
- Launched: 23 November 1943
- Sponsored by: Mrs. Gardner T. Gillette
- Completed: 4 December 1943
- Identification: Call sign: KVBW
- Fate: Transferred to US Navy, 4 December 1943

United States
- Name: Shaula
- Namesake: The star Shaula
- Acquired: 4 December 1943
- Commissioned: 5 May 1944
- Decommissioned: 24 June 1946
- Stricken: 19 July 1946
- Identification: Hull symbol: AK-118; Call sign: NTUC
- Fate: Laid up in the, National Defense Reserve Fleet, Olympia, Washington, 25 June 1946; Sold for commercial use, 7 July 1947, removed from fleet, 9 July 1947
- Notes: Name reverted to James Screven when laid up in Reserve Fleet

Italy
- Name: Olimpia
- Owner: Achille Lauro
- Fate: Sold for scrapping, 1969

General characteristics
- Class & type: Crater-class cargo ship
- Displacement: 4,023 long tons (4,088 t) (standard); 14,550 long tons (14,780 t) (full load)
- Length: 441 ft 6 in (134.57 m)
- Beam: 56 ft 11 in (17.35 m)
- Draft: 28 ft 4 in (8.64 m)
- Installed power: 2 × Oil fired 450 °F (232 °C) boilers, operating at 220 psi (1,500 kPa) , (manufactured by Combustion Engineering); 2,500 shp (1,900 kW)
- Propulsion: 1 × Vertical triple-expansion reciprocating steam engine, (manufactured by General Machinery Corp., Hamilton, Ohio); 1 × screw propeller
- Speed: 12.5 kn (23.2 km/h; 14.4 mph)
- Capacity: 7,800 t (7,700 long tons) DWT; 444,206 cu ft (12,578.5 m^{3}) (non-refrigerated)
- Complement: 206
- Armament: 1 × 5 in (130 mm)/38 caliber dual purpose gun; 4 × 40 mm (1.6 in) 40mm Bofors anti-aircraft gun mounts; 6 × 20 mm (0.79 in) Oerlikon cannons anti-aircraft gun mounts

USS Shaula (AK-118) was a Crater-class cargo ship, converted from a Liberty Ship, commissioned by the US Navy for service in World War II. She was first named after James Screven, an American general during the American Revolutionary War. She was renamed and commissioned after Shaula, the second-brightest star system in the constellation of Scorpius. She was responsible for delivering troops, goods and equipment to locations in the war zone.

== Construction ==
James Screven was laid down on 4 October 1943, under a Maritime Commission (MARCOM) contract, MC hull 1213, by the St. Johns River Shipbuilding Company, Jacksonville, Florida; she was sponsored by Mrs. Gardner T. Gillette, a direct descendant of the namesake, and launched on 23 November 1943. She was acquired by the US Navy, under a bareboat charter on 4 December 1943, and renamed Shaula. She was converted for naval service by the Gibbs Gas Engine Co., Jacksonville, and commissioned in Jacksonville, on 5 May 1944.

== Service history ==
On 17 May, Shaula departed for Hampton Roads, Virginia, on her shakedown cruise. On 1 June, she was attached to the Naval Transportation Service and, two days later, sailed for Davisville, Rhode Island, where she loaded cargo. In mid-June, she was underway for Pearl Harbor, via New York City, Guantánamo Bay, and the Panama Canal Zone.

Shaula arrived at Pearl Harbor on 13 July; discharged her cargo; and sailed for Naval Supply Depot (NSD), Oakland, California, on 3 August. There, she was converted to a fleet issue ship for dry provisions, loaded with cargo, and ordered to return to Pearl Harbor. Upon arriving there on the 30th, she was rerouted to Seeadler Harbor, Manus. From 20 September to 16 October, she discharged cargo to U.S. 3rd Fleet units and, when empty, sailed for San Pedro, Los Angeles, to reload.

Shaula stood out of San Pedro on 23 November 1944. She called at Pearl Harbor, and continued to Eniwetok, where she provisioned fleet units from 15 to 25 December 1944, when she moved to Ulithi. She remained there until 12 February 1945, when she sailed in convoy for Guam. Eight days later, she sailed for San Francisco. After completing voyage repairs and reloading, she headed west, on 3 April, for Ulithi and Leyte Gulf.

The cargo ship remained in Leyte Gulf from 25 May to 2 October, when she sailed for Wakayama, Japan, via Okinawa. Shaula departed Wakayama, three weeks later for Bungo Suido, to provision minesweepers; thence to Hire Wan, Nagasaki, and Sasebo.

=== Typhoon Nora ===
On 19 November 1945, she was underway from Sasebo to Samar, Philippine Islands. On 24 November, Shaula was in the center of Typhoon Nora, containing winds in excess of 100 kn (190 km/h; 120 mph). She lost one lifeboat and one life raft. The next day, she was still in the center of the typhoon. In heavy seas and rolling 47°, Shaula lost two LCMs over the side. She reached Samar the next day and entered drydock for repairs. After they were completed, she operated in the Philippine Islands until departing for Shanghai, on 15 February 1946. She also visited Yokohama and Manus, before entering Pearl Harbor, on 3 May, en route to the U.S. West Coast.

== Decommissioning ==
Shaula arrived at Seattle, Washington, on 31 May 1946, and prepared for decommissioning. She was returned to WSA on 25 June; stricken from the Navy List on 19 July 1946. She was sold to Italy, on 7 July 1947, and withdrawn from the fleet on 9 July 1947.

== Commercial history ==
Renamed SS Olimpia, she was temporarily used as an emigrant carrier but reverted to a cargo only role in 1951. Achille Lauro was a right wing politician who expanded out of cargo shipping into the emigrant business. She was a ship with basic accommodation which had been hastily crammed for emigrant passengers. She was included in the list of vessels on whose regular line voyages the International Refugee Organization proposed to make block bookings in the year to July 1950. In 1951 her passenger accommodation was removed and she sailed from 1952 to 1968, on Lauro's cargo-only service. Her route was Genoa to Australia via Naples, Italy, Suez, Aden, Bombay, Singapore, Fremantle and Sydney, Australia. In 1968 she was scrapped at La Spezia.

== Military awards and honors ==
No battle stars are recorded in the Navy Listing for Shaula. However, her crew was eligible for the following medals and campaign ribbons:

- China Service Medal (extended)
- American Campaign Medal
- Asiatic–Pacific Campaign Medal
- World War II Victory Medal
- Navy Occupation Service Medal (with Asia clasp)
- Philippine Liberation Medal

== Bibliography ==
- "St. John's River Shipbuilding, Jacksonville FL". ShipbuildingHistory.com. 16 October 2010.
- Maritime Administration. "James Screven". Ship History Database Vessel Status Card. U.S. Department of Transportation, Maritime Administration.
- "USS Shaula (AK-118)". NavSource. 13 June 2014.
- "Shaula". Dictionary of American Naval Fighting Ships. Naval History and Heritage Command. 9 September 2015. This article incorporates text from this source, which is in the public domain.
- "SS James Screven".
