= Midway Cemetery =

Cemetery in Midway, Georgia, United States

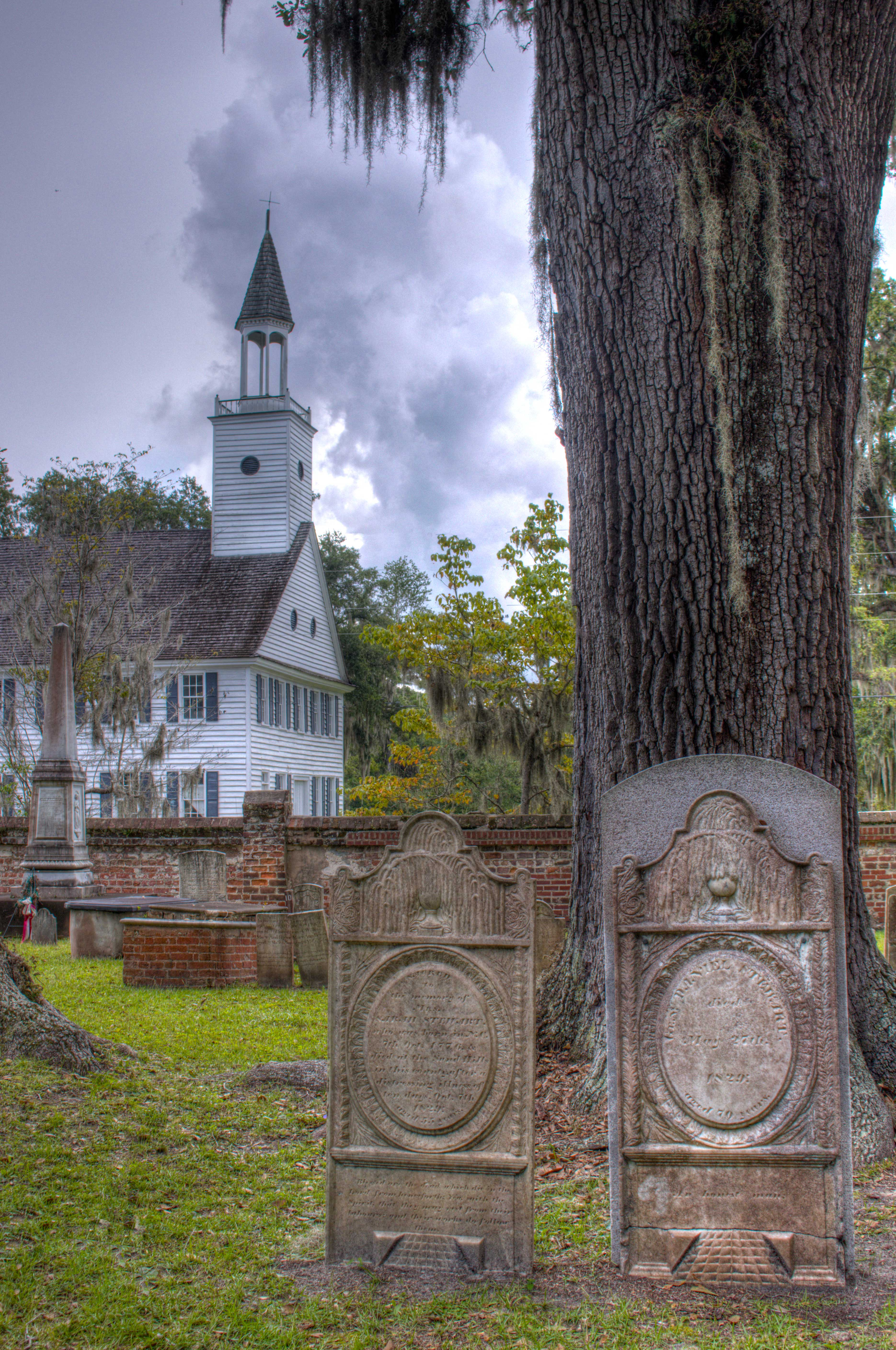
- Looking east to Midway Congregational Church
- Interactive map of Midway Cemetery

Details
- Established: c. 1756 (270 years ago)
- Location: Georgia State Route 17; Midway, Georgia
- Country: United States
- Coordinates: 31.80619°N 81.43128°W
- Size: 2 acres (0.81 ha)
- Find a Grave: Midway Cemetery

Midway Cemetery is a historic cemetery in Midway, Georgia, United States. Containing around 1,200 graves, the cemetery stands directly across State Route 17 from Midway Congregational Church, a 1792 construction. The cemetery is believed to have been established shortly after the construction of the original church, in 1756, which was burned during the Revolutionary War. During the war, the cemetery was used as a corral to keep animals removed from area plantations, while the church was used as a slaughterhouse.

Both the church and cemetery were added to the National Register of Historic Places (NRHP) in 1973. They are part of the Midway Historic District.

Among the notable burials in the cemetery are Daniel Stewart and James Screven, generals in the Revolutionary War (see Stewart–Screven Monument); John Jones, a major; and senator John Elliott. There is a monument honoring Stewart and Screven in the center of the cemetery.

A plaque on the right-hand post of the gate was added by the Department of the Interior, marking its addition to the NRHP.

The cemetery is now closed to burials, the last interment being in 1956.

== See also ==
- National Register of Historic Places listings in Georgia
