= Provincial Congress of Georgia =

Historical legislature of Georgia

Georgia Provincial Congress
- Continental Union Flag

Type
- Type: Unicameral

History
- Founded: July 4, 1775
- Disbanded: February 1776
- Succeeded by: Georgia General Assembly

Leadership
- President of the Provincial Congress: Lyman Hall (1775–1776)
- Secretary/Clerk: George Walton

Structure
- Authority: Governmental authority in Patriot controlled territory in Georgia

Meeting place
- Savannah, Georgia

Constitution
- Rules and Regulations of 1776

The Georgia Provincial Congress was an extralegal representative assembly that served as the revolutionary government of Georgia during the early stages of the American Revolution. It replaced royal authority and guided the colony's transition from a British province into an independent state. Prominent Georgians who participated in revolutionary governance included Lyman Hall, George Walton, Button Gwinnett, and Archibald Bulloch.

== Background ==
As tensions escalated between the Thirteen Colonies and Great Britain, political authority in Georgia gradually shifted away from royal officials toward Patriot leaders. Compared to other colonies, Georgia was slower to join the revolutionary movement. Royal Governor Sir James Wright initially retained control longer than most governors.

However, by 1775, local leaders and parish representatives began organizing resistance. With the collapse of royal authority, delegates formed a Provincial Congress to coordinate opposition to British policies and assume governing responsibilities. This body acted as the de facto government of Georgia during the early Revolution.

== First Provincial Congress ==
The First Provincial Congress met in Savannah in July 1775. Delegates represented various parishes and districts across the colony. Though not legally recognized by British authorities, the Congress exercised both legislative and executive powers. It organized resistance by, raising militia forces, Enforcing the Continental Association (boycotts of British goods), and establishing local committees to govern towns and districts. The Congress also aligned Georgia with the broader colonial resistance movement and supported cooperation with the Continental Congress.

== Second Provincial Congress ==
A subsequent congress met later in 1775 and into early 1776 as revolutionary control expanded. During this period, royal authority effectively collapsed after Governor James Wright fled Savannah in early 1776. The Provincial Congress continued to function as Georgia's central authority, strengthening militia organization and preparing for independent governance.

== Functions and legacy ==
The Georgia Provincial Congress was unicameral and combined legislative and executive functions. It acted as the central governing authority during the breakdown of British rule, coordinating military defense and civil administration. In February 1776, the Congress adopted the “Rules and Regulations,” which served as Georgia's first constitutional framework. This marked the transition from an improvised revolutionary body to a formal state government. The Provincial Congress was soon replaced by a more permanent system of governance, eventually leading to the establishment of the Georgia General Assembly.

== See also ==
- James Screven, member of the Provincial Congress of Georgia
