= Daniel Stewart (brigadier general) =

American military figure and politician

- Born: December 20, 1761; Liberty County, Georgia, U.S.
- Died: May 27, 1829 (aged 67); Cedar Hill plantation, Riceboro, Liberty County, Georgia, U.S.
- Spouses: Martha Pender (m. 1783; died 1784) Sarah Susannah Oswald (m. 1785; died 1807) Sarah Hines (m. 1810–1829)
- Children: John Stewart IV; Mary Stewart; Daniel McLachlan Stewart; Sophia Stewart; Susannah Stewart; Joseph Oswald Stewart; Martha Stewart; Sarah Caroline Stewart; Georgia Drusilla Stewart
- Relatives: Martha Stewart Bulloch (granddaughter); Irvine Stephens Bulloch (grandson); Theodore Roosevelt (great-grandson); Eleanor Roosevelt (great-great-granddaughter)
- Military career
- Allegiance: United States
- Branch: Continental Army; United States Army
- Service years: 1776-1815
- Rank: Brigadier General
- Unit: Georgia Militia
- Conflicts: American Revolutionary War; War of 1812

Daniel Stewart (December 20, 1761 – May 27, 1829) was an American politician and brigadier general in the Georgia Militia. He joined the militia in 1776 and served during the American Revolutionary War and the War of 1812.

== Early life ==
Daniel Stewart was born in Liberty County, Georgia, to military officer John Stewart Jr. (died September 6, 1776) and Susannah Bacon (died 1766). His paternal grandparents, John Stewart Sr. (died c. 1763) and Jerusha (maiden name unknown; died 1762), were English immigrants who settled in Dorchester, South Carolina. Daniel's siblings who died young were Ann (died 1759), Mary (died 1766), and John III (died 1767). He had two elder sisters who survived, Sarah (born 1750) and Susannah (born 1758). Daniel also had a younger half-sister, Elizabeth (born 1774), from John Jr.'s second marriage to Sarah Nickols.

== Career ==
Stewart served as a state representative from 1785 to 1787, sheriff of Liberty County, Georgia, from 1795 to 1797, and state senator for three terms between 1802 and 1811.

== Personal life ==
On February 20, 1783, he married Martha Pender. She died giving birth to their son:

- John Stewart IV (1784–?).

In 1785, Daniel married Sarah Susannah Oswald (November 2, 1770 – December 25, 1807), a daughter of Joseph Oswald Jr. and Ann Carter. Her brother Thomas Hepworth Oswald was the patrilineal great-great-grandfather of assassin Lee Harvey Oswald (1939–1963). She bore Daniel six children:

- Mary Stewart (1788–?)
- Daniel McLachlan Stewart (1791–?)
- Sophia Stewart (1792–?)
- Susannah Stewart (1794–?)
- Joseph Oswald Stewart (1797–?)
- Martha "Patsy" Stewart (March 15, 1799 — October 30, 1864). She first married Senator John Elliott (1773—1827) and later married Major James Stephens Bulloch (1793—1849). Patsy's children with Bulloch included:
  - Anna Louisa Bulloch (1833—1893)
  - Martha "Mittie" Bulloch (1835—1884). She married Theodore "Thee" Roosevelt, Sr. (1831—1878). Thee and Mittie were the parents of Anna "Bamie" Roosevelt Cowles (1855—1931), President Theodore Roosevelt (1858—1919), Elliott Bulloch Roosevelt (1860—1894), and Corinne Roosevelt Robinson (1861—1933). Elliott and his wife, socialite Anna Rebecca Hall (1863—1892), were the parents of First Lady Anna Eleanor Roosevelt (1884—1962).
  - Charles Irvine Bulloch (1838-1841)
  - Irvine Stephens Bulloch (1842—1898)

On March 6, 1810, General Stewart married Sarah Hines, widow of Captain Elijah Lewis. They had two daughters:

- Sarah Caroline Stewart (1813—1815)
- Georgia Drusilla Stewart (1814—1820)

He died in his winter home at Cedar Hill Plantation.

=== Eponymous places ===
Fort Stewart and Stewart County, Georgia, are named after Daniel Stewart. Additionally, the Stewart–Screven Monument in Midway Cemetery in Midway, Georgia, was erected in 1915 in honor of Stewart and fellow Revolutionary War general James Screven.
