= Fort Stewart =

US Army post in southeast Georgia

- Georgia
- Shoulder sleeve insignia of the 3rd Infantry Division

Site information
- Type: Army post
- Controlled by: United States Army

Location
- Coordinates: 31°52′48″N 81°36′27″W

Site history
- Built: January 1941
- In use: 1941–present

Garrison information
- Garrison: 3rd Infantry Division

Fort Stewart is a United States Army post in the U.S. state of Georgia. It lies primarily in Liberty and Bryan counties, but also extends into smaller portions of Evans, Long, and Tattnall Counties. The nearby city of Hinesville, along with Ft. Stewart and the rest of Liberty and Long Counties, comprise the Hinesville metropolitan area. Much of Fort Stewart's garrison are members of the 3rd Infantry Division.

The Fort Stewart Military Reservation includes about 280,000 acres (1,100 km^{2}), including land that was formerly the town of Clyde, Georgia.

== Geography ==
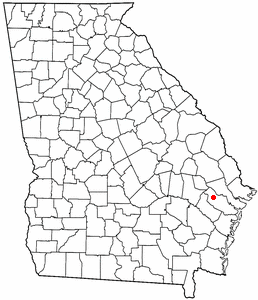
Location of Fort Stewart, Georgia

Fort Stewart is located along the Canoochee River.

== Units ==
Units assigned to Fort Stewart are:

3rd Infantry Division

- Division Headquarters and Headquarters Battalion
  - 1st Armored Brigade Combat Team (1st ABCT), 3rd Infantry Division "Raider" – regionally allocated to Europe
    - Headquarters and Headquarters Company (HHC), 1st ABCT
    - 5th Squadron, 7th Cavalry Regiment–Reconnaissance, Surveillance, and Target Acquisition (RSTA) "Warpaint"
    - 2nd Battalion, 7th Infantry Regiment "Cottonbalers"
    - 1st Battalion, 64th Armor Regiment "Desert Rogue"
    - 3rd Battalion, 69th Armor Regiment "Speed & Power"
    - 1st Battalion, 41st Field Artillery Regiment (1-41st FAR) "Glory's Guns"
    - 10th Brigade Engineer Battalion (10th BEB) "Bridge the Sky"
    - 3rd Brigade Support Battalion (3rd BSB) "Ready to Roll"
  - 2nd Armored Brigade Combat Team (2nd ABCT) "Spartans" as of March 2023, 2nd ABCT is the 'most modern' ABCT
    - Headquarters and Headquarters Company (HHC), 2nd ABCT
    - 6th Squadron, 8th Cavalry Regiment "Mustang"
    - 3rd Battalion, 15th Infantry Regiment "Old China Hands"
    - 3rd Battalion, 67th Armor Regiment ”Hounds of Hell"
    - 2nd Battalion, 69th Armor Regiment "Panthers"
    - 1st Battalion, 9th Field Artillery Regiment (1-9th FAR)"Battlekings"
    - 9th Brigade Engineer Battalion (9th BEB) "Gila"
    - 703rd Brigade Support Battalion (703rd BSB) "Maintain"
  - 3rd Division Artillery (DIVARTY) "Marne Thunder" has training and readiness oversight of field artillery battalions, which remain organic to their brigade combat teams.
    - Headquarters and Headquarters Battery, DIVARTY
    - 63rd Expeditionary Signal Battalion (located at Fort Stewart, but part to 35th Signal Brigade
    - 83rd Chemical Battalion (assigned to the division as part of the Army 2030 reform)
    - 92nd Engineer Battalion (assigned to the division as part of the Army 2030 reform)
    - 103rd Intelligence and Electronic Warfare Battalion (reactivated 16 September 2022 as part of the Army 2030 reform)
  - 3rd Division Sustainment Brigade
    - Headquarters and Headquarters Company (HHC), 3rd Division Sustainment Brigade
    - Division Sustainment Troops Battalion
    - 87th Division Sustainment Support Battalion

== History ==
Fort Stewart is named for Brigadier General Daniel Stewart, a hero of the Revolutionary War and a political leader from Liberty County, Georgia. It is the largest Army installation east of the Mississippi River, covering 280,000 acres (1,100 km^{2}), which include parts of Liberty, Long, Bryan, Evans, and Tattnall Counties. The reservation is about 39 miles (63 km) across from east to west, and 19 miles (31 km) from north to south. During World War II, the camp had billeting space for 2,705 officers, and 37,267 enlisted men. It is close to the East Coast, and two deepwater ports: Savannah, Georgia (42 mi) and Charleston, South Carolina (142 mi). Tank, field artillery, helicopter gunnery, and small-arms ranges operate simultaneously throughout the year with little time lost to bad weather.

=== Anti-Aircraft Artillery Center ===
In June 1940, Congress authorized funding for the purchase of property in coastal Georgia for the purpose of building an antiaircraft artillery training center. It was to be located just outside Hinesville, Georgia, some 40 miles (64 km) southwest of Savannah.

On 1 July 1940, the first 5,000 acres (20 km^{2}) were bought and subsequent purchases followed. Eventually the reservation would include over 280,000 acres (1100 km^{2}) and stretch over five counties. The large expanse of property was required for the firing ranges and impact areas which an antiaircraft artillery training center would need for live-fire training.

In November 1940, the Anti-Aircraft Artillery Training Center was officially designated as Camp Stewart, in honor of General Daniel Stewart, a native of Liberty County, who had fought with Francis Marion during the American Revolution, and who became one of the county's military heroes. An announcement of the new post's name was made in January 1941.

During the early months, training was done on wooden mock-ups, since real antiaircraft guns were in short supply. Live-firing exercises were conducted on the beaches of St. Augustine and Amelia Island, Florida, since the necessary ranges and impact areas had not been completed at Camp Stewart. This live-fire training over the ocean continued until September 1941, while at Camp Stewart practice firing and searchlight training progressed. In fall of 1941, the Carolina Maneuvers were held, and all the antiaircraft units from Camp Stewart participated.

Savannah's First Bryan Baptist Church had a special service for soldiers from the Savannah Air Base and Camp Stewart 21 December 1941. Reverend Terrill wrote a letter to Asa H. Gordon, director of the Colored SSSS, extending the invitation to the soldiers. Church members took at least one soldier home from the service for Sunday dinner. Reverend Terrill, at the special service for soldiers, preached on "The Negro's Place in National Defense". Thelma Lee Stevens gave the welcome address. Scout Westley W. Law was master of ceremonies. The National Guard units departed, and new units came in for training. Facilities were expanded and improved. Antiaircraft artillery training was upgraded and a detachment of Women Airforce Service Pilots (WASPs) soon arrived at the air facility on post, Liberty Field, to fly planes to tow targets for the live-fire exercises. Eventually, radio-controlled airplane targets came into use as a more effective and safer means of live-fire practice.

As the war progressed, Camp Stewart's training programs continued expanding to keep pace with the needs placed upon it. Units were shipped out promptly upon completion of their training, and new units received in their place. The camp provided well-trained soldiers for duty in the European, Mediterranean, North African, and Pacific Theaters.

=== POW camp ===
By late 1943, Camp Stewart assumed a new responsibility, as one of many holding areas designated in the United States for German and Italian prisoners of war (POWs), who had fallen into Allied hands during fighting in North Africa. These men were held in two separate POW facilities on post, and they were used as a labor force for base operations, construction projects, and area farming.

Beside its initial purposes as an antiaircraft artillery training center, Camp Stewart also served as a cooks' and bakers' school, and as a staging area for a number of Army postal units. By spring 1944, the camp was bulging at its seams, as more than 55,000 soldiers occupied the facility during the build-up for the D-Day invasion. Almost overnight, though, the post was virtually empty, as these units shipped out for England. With the D-Day invasion and Allied control of the air over Europe, the need for antiaircraft units diminished, and in response, the antiaircraft training at Camp Stewart was phased out. By January 1945, only the POW camps were still functioning.

=== After World War II ===
With the end of the war, Camp Stewart came to life briefly as a separation center for redeployed soldiers, but on 30 September 1945, the post was inactivated. Only two officers, 10 enlisted men, and 50 civilian employees maintained the facilities, and the Georgia National Guard only did training during the summers.

=== Korean War ===
With the outbreak of hostilities in Korea in June 1950, the U.S. once again found itself with the need to update training and to prepare new soldiers to meet the crisis in Korea. Camp Stewart was reopened on 9 August 1950, its facilities repaired, and National Guard troops brought in for training. On 28 December 1950, Camp Stewart was redesignated as the 3rd Army Anti-Aircraft Artillery Training Center. Intensive training of soldiers destined for service in Korea began. Since control of the air in Korea was not seriously challenged by the Communist forces, in late 1953, Camp Stewart's role changed from solely antiaircraft training to include armor and tank firing.

When the Korean War eventually cooled down, the U.S. obviously would be required to maintain a ready and able military force to deal with any potential threat to itself and its allies. Camp Stewart would have a role to play in that mission. The decision was made that the post would no longer be viewed as a temporary installation. On 21 March 1956, it was redesignated as Fort Stewart. Its role would continue to evolve in response to specific needs and world events.

In 1959, Fort Stewart was redesignated as an Armor and Artillery Firing Center, since its old antiaircraft ranges and impact areas were better suited for this purpose in the new age of missiles. By 1961, a feeling arose that Fort Stewart may have served its usefulness, and a movement was afoot to deactivate the post again. However, the age of missiles brought with it new threats and a new mission for Fort Stewart.

=== Cuban Missile Crisis ===
As a result of the Cuban Missile Crisis in October 1962, the 1st Armored Division was ordered to Fort Stewart for staging, and in the short span of two weeks, the population of the fort rose from 3,500 to over 30,000 personnel. The country prepared for the worst, but in the end, a compromise was reached, and the crisis passed. Shortly after, word was received at Fort Stewart that a VIP would be visiting the post and that the post conference room was not worthy of a person of this stature. Thus, preparations were rapidly made to convert this conference room into a more suitable one. The command group at Fort Stewart quickly discerned that this VIP would be none other than Commander in Chief, President John F. Kennedy. He arrived at Hunter Field on 26 Nov. 1962 and flew to Donovan Parade Field at Fort Stewart, where he reviewed the entire 1st Armored Division. From there, he was taken to the new conference room, where he was briefed on armed forces readiness to respond to the Cuban Missile Crisis, and then he visited troops in nearby training areas.

=== Vietnam War ===
After the Cuban Missile Crisis had passed, the Cold War situation kept Fort Stewart in an active training role. During the late 1960s, another developing situation brought about yet another change in Fort Stewart's mission. With tensions growing in the divided country of Vietnam, the U.S. found itself becoming increasingly involved in that conflict. The Vietnamese terrain and the type of war being fought there demanded an increased aviation capability through the use of helicopters and light, fixed-wing aircraft. This brought about a need for more aviators. In response to this need, an element of the U.S. Army Aviation School at Fort Rucker, Alabama, was transferred to Fort Stewart in 1966. Helicopter pilot training and helicopter gunnery courses became Fort Stewart's new mission. In an ironic twist, now instead of training soldiers to shoot down aircraft, Fort Stewart was training soldiers to fly them.

=== Hunter Army Airfield ===
When the U.S. Air Force closed its base at Hunter Field in Savannah in 1967, the Army promptly assumed control and in conjunction with the flight training being conducted at Fort Stewart, the U.S. Army Flight Training Center came into being. The helicopter pilot training was rapidly accelerated and pilots were trained and soon sent to duty all over the world, with a large percentage seeing active duty in Vietnam. The Army established the first dedicated attack helicopter training school at Hunter in July 1967. The Attack Helicopter Training Department (AHTD) trained Army, Marine, and a few foreign officers (principally Spanish Navy) in the AH-1G Cobra attack helicopter.

Hunter Army Airfield covers about 5,400 acres (22 km^{2}) and is also the home of the U.S. Coast Guard Station, Savannah – the largest helicopter unit in the Coast Guard. It provides Savannah and the Southeast United States with around-the-clock search-and-rescue coverage of its coastal areas.

In 1969, President Nixon planned to reduce American involvement in Vietnam by training the Vietnamese military to take over the war. In conjunction with this, helicopter flight training for Vietnamese pilots began at the AHTD in 1970 and continued until 1972. Gradually America's involvement in Vietnam dwindled and by mid-1972 the flight training aspect of Fort Stewart's mission was terminated, and both Hunter Field and Fort Stewart reverted to garrison status. The following year, Hunter Field was closed entirely and Fort Stewart sat idle, with the exception of the National Guard training, which continued to be conducted at the installation.

== After the Vietnam era ==
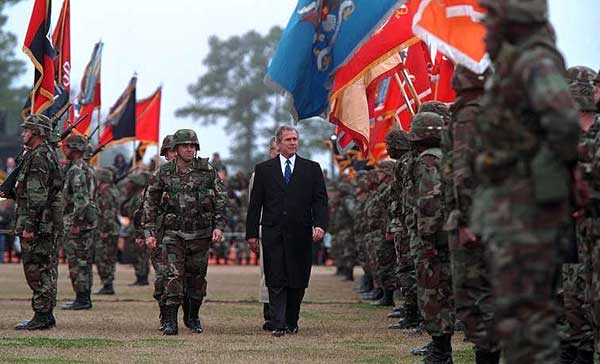
President George W. Bush inspected the troops at Fort Stewart on February 12, 2001.

On 1 July 1974, the soon-to-be reactivated 1st Battalion, 75th Infantry Regiment (Ranger), parachuted into Fort Stewart. The battalion was formally reactivated the following month. It was the first Army Ranger battalion activated since the Second World War. Hunter Army Airfield was reopened to support the training and activities of the Rangers.

In October 1974, Headquarters, 24th Infantry Division was activated at Fort Stewart. This historic unit, which had seen active and arduous service in the Pacific during WW II and in the Korean War, and served as an element of NATO forces defending Western Europe, had been inactive since 1970. The "Victory" Division, as it was known, was going to make Fort Stewart its home. Perhaps fittingly, the V-shaped layout of the main post itself represented the "V" for the Victory Division. The 24th Infantry Division would make Fort Stewart uniquely its own.

With the reactivation of the 24th Infantry Division, the post entered a new phase in its history. Facilities were upgraded, and new permanent structures replaced many of the old World War II-era wooden buildings from the days of Camp Stewart. On 1 October 1980, the 24th Infantry Division was designated a mechanized infantry division, and assigned as the heavy division of the XVIII Airborne Corps, the core element of the newly organized Rapid Deployment Force. This designation was the fruition of that potential first realized by those who served at the post during the Cuban Missile Crisis.

The 24th Infantry Division began intensive training over the expanse of piney woods and lowlands of the post, and conducted live-fire exercises on many of the old Camp Stewart antiaircraft ranges. Additional deployment training and exercises took division units from Georgia's woodlands to the National Training Center at Fort Irwin, California, as well as to other areas of the world, such as Egypt and Turkey. The division was regularly seen in REFORGER exercises in Germany and BRIGHT STAR in Egypt. Its training was continuous. The mission of the Rapid Deployment Force was to be prepared to deploy to practically any point on the globe at a moment's notice, to deal with whatever threat might be discerned.

In August 1990, Iraq invaded and overran neighboring Kuwait, and threatened to do the same to Saudi Arabia. The Port of Savannah worked around the clock to load and ship the division's heavy equipment, while aircraft shuttles from Hunter Field flew the division's personnel to Saudi Arabia. Within a month, the entire division had been reassembled in Saudi Arabia to face the possible invasion of that country by Iraqi forces. Fort Stewart had a growing influx of National Guard and Reserve units, who were being mobilized to support the operations in Saudi Arabia and to assume the tasks at the post, which had formerly been accomplished by 24th Infantry Division personnel. In many ways, Fort Stewart appeared to be almost a ghost town, as never before had the entire division been deployed from the post at one time. Within eight months, the crisis at the Persian Gulf had concluded, and the 24th Infantry Division triumphantly returned to its home in coastal Georgia.

The post-Cold War drawdown of forces in Europe resulted in many storied units coming home to the US. On 25 April 1996, "ownership" of Fort Stewart passed, as the 24th Infantry Division was inactivated and the 3rd Infantry Division was reactivated, thus began a new chapter in the history of Fort Stewart. Fort Stewart also was a leading mobilization station for Army units preparing for tours in Operation Iraqi Freedom, as well as two-week National Guard annual training.

In January 2025, two soldiers were killed during a field-training exercise at the facility.

=== 2025 mass shooting ===
On August 6, 2025, a mass shooting happened at the 2nd Armored Brigade Combat Team station. Five service members were injured in the attack, and a sergeant of the U.S. Army, later identified as 28-year-old Quornelius Radford, was taken into custody. Radford was accused of opening fire with a personal handgun before being tackled by multiple unarmed soldiers and stopping the attack.

Six soldiers received Meritorious Service Medals for their actions in apprehending Radford. In a ceremony the day after the attack, the six soldiers were decorated by Army secretary Daniel P. Driscoll on behalf of president Donald Trump and the Defense Secretary, Pete Hegseth. Brigadier General John Lubas, the commander of the 3rd Infantry Division, credited the soldiers with saving lives due to their heroic actions.

Radford was charged with two counts of attempted premeditated murder, three counts of aggravated assault inflicting grievous bodily harm, three counts of aggravated assault with a deadly weapon, and one count of domestic violence. Radford received a charge of domestic violence as one of the shooting victims was an "intimate partner of the accused". Attorneys for the Army allege that Radford admitted to purposely attempting to target his unit's leadership in the attack. Radford, as an active-duty soldier and because the crime was committed on a military installation, would be prosecuted by a military court.

On March 12, 2026, prosecutors for the Army said that Radford wanted to plead guilty to two counts of attempted murder, three counts of aggravated assault and one count of domestic violence. Radford's defense said that he would plead not guilty to the other charges and that when he opened fire he did not intend to kill any of his victims. On June 23, Radford was sentenced by a military judge, after he opted against a trial by a jury of soldiers, to life imprisonment in a military prison.

== Demographics ==
Fort Stewart
- Census-designated place
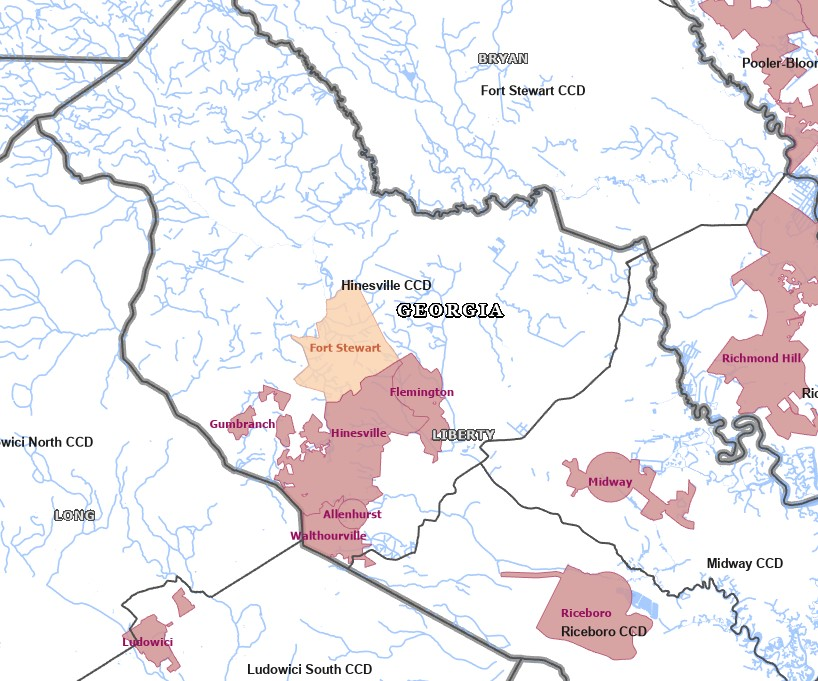

- Location within Georgia Location within the United States
- Country: United States
- State: Georgia
- County: Liberty
- Elevation: 75 ft (23 m)

Population (2020)
  - Total: 8,821
- Time zone: UTC−6 (Central (CST))
  - Summer (DST): UTC−5 (CDT)
- GNIS feature ID: 2402504

A small portion of the base has been designated as a census-designated place (CDP) for statistical purposes, with a residential population at the 2020 census of 8,821. Fort Stewart was first listed as an unincorporated place in the 1970 U.S. census and designated a CDP in the 1980 United States census.

Historical population
Census	Pop.	Note	%±
1970	4,467		—
1980	15,031		236.5%
1990	13,774		−8.4%
2000	11,205		−18.7%
2010	4,924		−56.1%
2020	8,821		79.1%
U.S. Decennial Census; 1970 & 1980; 1990 2000; 2010 2020

=== Racial and ethnic composition ===
Fort Stewart CDP, Georgia – Racial and ethnic composition Note: the US Census treats Hispanic/Latino as an ethnic category. This table excludes Latinos from the racial categories and assigns them to a separate category. Hispanics/Latinos may be of any race.
Race / Ethnicity (NH = Non-Hispanic)	Pop 2000	Pop 2010	Pop 2020	% 2000	% 2010	% 2020
White alone (NH)	5,216	2,891	4,012	46.55%	58.71%	45.48%
Black or African American alone (NH)	4,024	1,141	2,147	35.91%	23.17%	24.34%
Native American or Alaska Native alone (NH)	71	28	59	0.63%	0.57%	0.67%
Asian alone (NH)	203	80	224	1.81%	1.62%	2.54%
Native Hawaiian or Pacific Islander alone (NH)	42	20	65	0.37%	0.41%	0.74%
Other race alone (NH)	31	7	45	0.28%	0.14%	0.51%
Multiracial (NH)	260	175	537	2.32%	3.55%	6.09%
Hispanic or Latino (any race)	1,358	582	1,732	12.12%	11.82%	19.63%
Total	11,205	4,924	8,821	100.00%	100.00%	100.00%

=== 2010 Census ===
As of the 2010 United States census, 4,924 people were living in the base. The racial makeup of the base was 58.7% White, 23.2% Black, 0.6% Native American, 1.6% Asian, 0.4% Pacific Islander, 0.1% from some other race, and 3.6% from two or more races; 11.8% were Hispanic or Latino of any race.

As of the 2000 census, 11,205 people, 1,849 households, and 1,791 families were living on the base. The population density was 1,697.1 people per square mile (655.3 people/km^{2}). The 1,936 housing units had an average density of 293.2 per square mile (113.2/km^{2}). The racial makeup of the base was 50.00% White, 36.75% African American, 0.72% Native American, 1.91% Asian, 0.41% Pacific Islander, 6.75% from other races, and 3.45% from two or more races. Hispanics or Latinos of any race were 12.12% of the population.

Of the 1,849 households, 81.7% had children under 18 living with them, 88.0% were married couples living together, 7.4% had a female householder with no husband present, and 3.1% were not families. About 2.9% of all households were made up of individuals, and 0.1% had someone living alone who was 65 or older. The average household size was 3.65 and the average family size was 3.68.

The age distribution was 27.3% under 18, 39.9% from 18 to 24, 31.6% from 25 to 44, 1.1% from 45 to 64, and 0.1% who were 65 or older. The median age was 22 years. For every 100 females, there were 197.0 males. For every 100 females age 18 and over, there were 251.8 males. All these statistics are consistent with Fort Stewart's military status.

The median income for a base household is $30,441, and for a family was $29,507. Males had a median income of $18,514 versus $17,250 for females. The per capita income for the base was $11,594. About 9.7% of families and 11.0% of the population were below the poverty line, including 13.0% of those under 18 and none of those 65 or over.

== Education ==
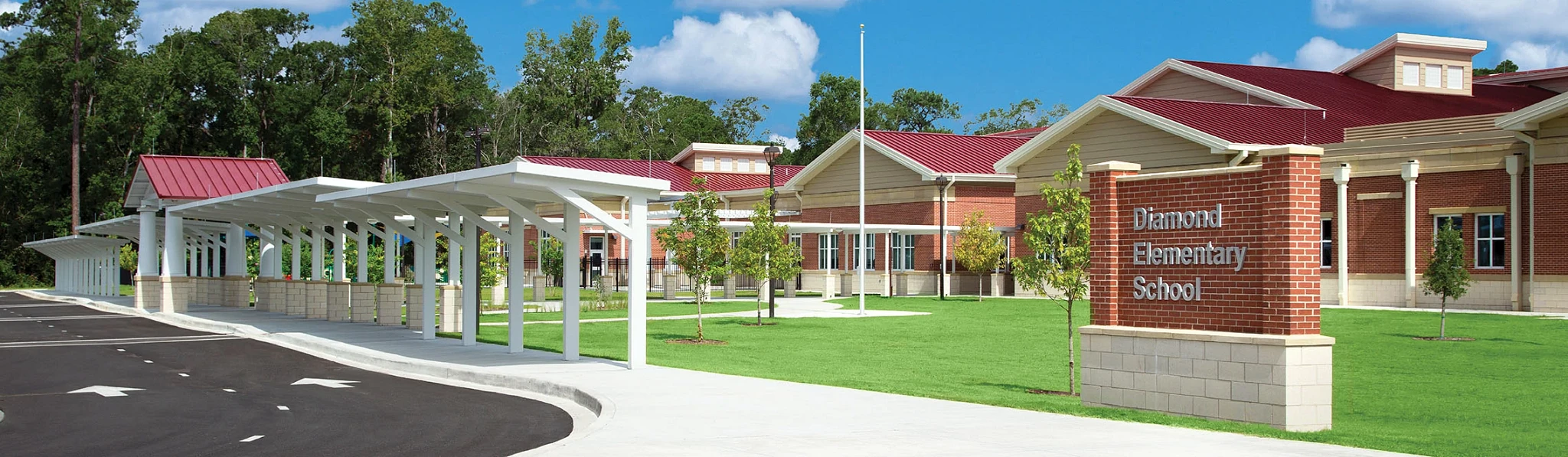
Diamond Elementary School

Fort Stewart's school district is the Department of Defense Education Activity (DoDEA).

The DoDEA operates these elementary schools on-post:

- James H. Diamond Elementary School (PreKindergarten to Grade 5)
- Kessler Elementary School (PreKindergarten to Grade 6)
- Murray Elementary School (PreKindergarten to Grade 5)

Students at the secondary level attend public schools operated by county school districts. Liberty County School District operates the public schools in Liberty County.

== Climate ==
According to the Köppen climate classification, Fort Stewart has a humid subtropical climate, Cfa on climate maps. The hottest temperature recorded in Fort Stewart was 110 °F (43.3 °C) on 15 July 1986, while the coldest temperature recorded was 0 °F (−17.8 °C) on 21 January 1985.

Climate data for Fort Stewart, Georgia, 1991–2020 normals, extremes 1941–present
Month	Jan	Feb	Mar	Apr	May	Jun	Jul	Aug	Sep	Oct	Nov	Dec	Year
Record high °F (°C)	87 (31)	85 (29)	93 (34)	97 (36)	103 (39)	105 (41)	110 (43)	106 (41)	102 (39)	99 (37)	88 (31)	86 (30)	110 (43)
Mean maximum °F (°C)	77.4 (25.2)	80.0 (26.7)	84.3 (29.1)	89.1 (31.7)	94.1 (34.5)	97.6 (36.4)	98.6 (37.0)	97.6 (36.4)	94.8 (34.9)	88.8 (31.6)	83.2 (28.4)	78.0 (25.6)	99.4 (37.4)
Mean daily maximum °F (°C)	62.7 (17.1)	66.5 (19.2)	72.6 (22.6)	79.2 (26.2)	85.2 (29.6)	89.4 (31.9)	91.6 (33.1)	90.3 (32.4)	86.6 (30.3)	79.5 (26.4)	70.9 (21.6)	64.9 (18.3)	78.3 (25.7)
Daily mean °F (°C)	51.9 (11.1)	55.0 (12.8)	60.9 (16.1)	67.3 (19.6)	74.2 (23.4)	79.8 (26.6)	82.2 (27.9)	81.6 (27.6)	77.8 (25.4)	69.2 (20.7)	59.8 (15.4)	54.1 (12.3)	67.8 (19.9)
Mean daily minimum °F (°C)	41.1 (5.1)	43.5 (6.4)	49.1 (9.5)	55.4 (13.0)	63.2 (17.3)	70.2 (21.2)	72.9 (22.7)	72.9 (22.7)	69.0 (20.6)	59.0 (15.0)	48.7 (9.3)	43.4 (6.3)	57.4 (14.1)
Mean minimum °F (°C)	23.4 (−4.8)	26.5 (−3.1)	31.6 (−0.2)	40.3 (4.6)	50.0 (10.0)	62.1 (16.7)	68.3 (20.2)	67.1 (19.5)	57.6 (14.2)	42.0 (5.6)	31.2 (−0.4)	27.2 (−2.7)	21.5 (−5.8)
Record low °F (°C)	0 (−18)	15 (−9)	19 (−7)	29 (−2)	40 (4)	50 (10)	61 (16)	56 (13)	42 (6)	27 (−3)	19 (−7)	10 (−12)	0 (−18)
Average precipitation inches (mm)	3.72 (94)	3.33 (85)	3.63 (92)	3.25 (83)	3.31 (84)	6.67 (169)	5.71 (145)	6.61 (168)	3.94 (100)	4.73 (120)	2.57 (65)	3.57 (91)	51.04 (1,296)
Average precipitation days (≥ 0.01 in)	7.7	7.4	7.0	6.1	7.2	11.6	11.1	11.9	8.3	6.2	5.8	7.4	97.7
Source 1: NOAA
Source 2: National Weather Service

== See also ==
- Georgia World War II Army Airfields
