= Lyman Hall =

American Founding Father and politician

Governor Lyman Hall
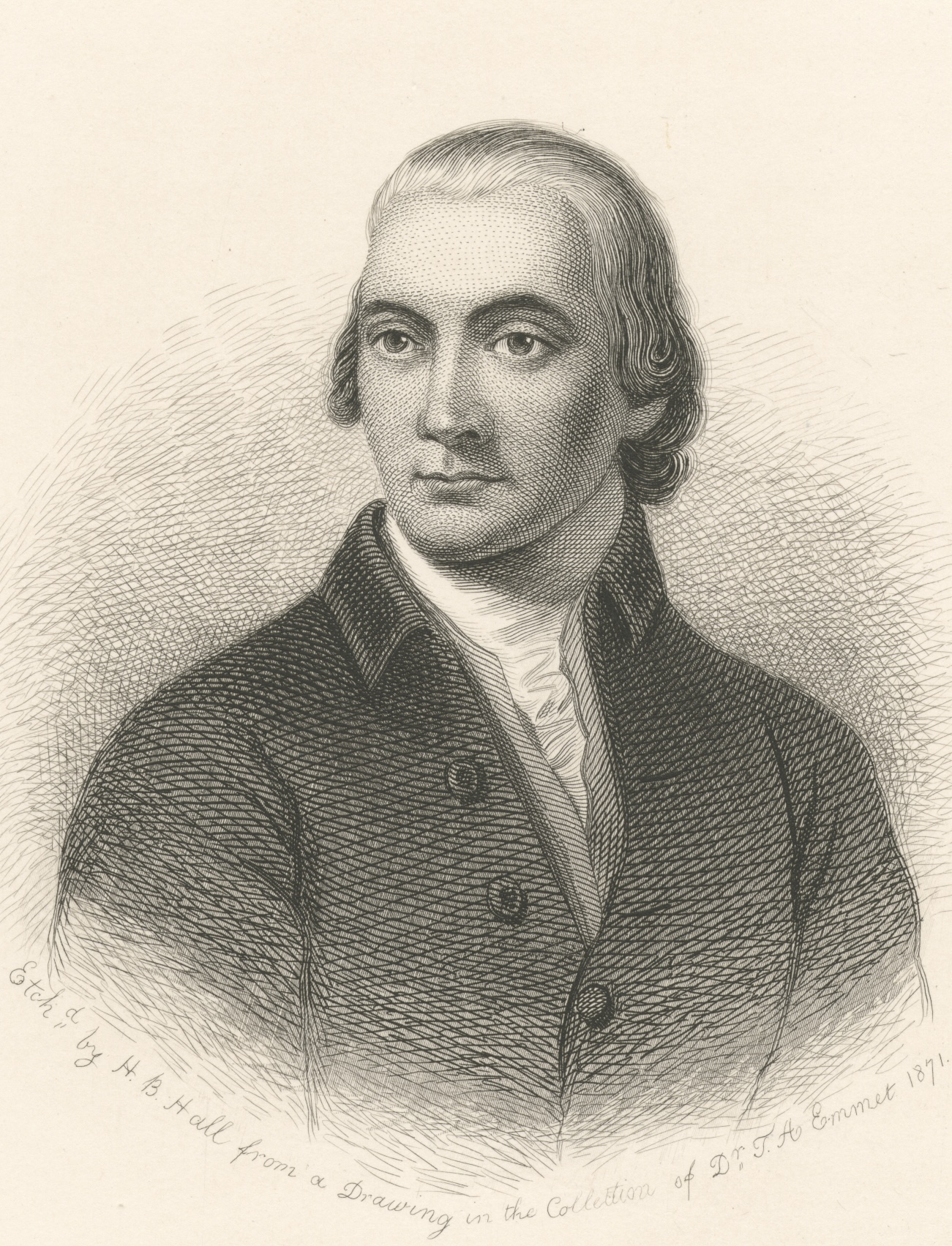
- Posthumous engraving, c. 1871

18th Governor of Georgia
- In office January 7, 1783 – January 9, 1784
- Preceded by: John Martin
- Succeeded by: John Houstoun

Delegate from Georgia to the Continental Congress
- In office 1775–1777

President of the Provincial Congress of Georgia
- In office 1775–1776

Personal details
- Born: April 12, 1724 Wallingford, Connecticut, British America
- Died: October 19, 1790 (aged 66) Burke County, Georgia, U.S.
- Party: Pro-Administration
- Spouse(s): Abigail Burr (1752-1753) and Mary Osborn (1757-1790)
- Children: Isaac Hall (1753-1794) and John Lyman Hall
- Profession: Clergyman; Medical Doctor; Member Continental Congress; Governor founder of University of Georgia

Lyman Hall (April 12, 1724 – October 19, 1790) was an American Founding Father, physician, clergyman, and statesman who signed the United States Declaration of Independence as a representative of Georgia. Hall County is named after him. He was one of four physicians to sign the Declaration, along with Benjamin Rush, Josiah Bartlett, and Matthew Thornton.

== Early life and family ==
Coat of Arms of Lyman Hall

Hall was born on April 12, 1724, in Wallingford, Connecticut. He was the son of John Hall, a minister, and Mary (née Street) Hall, daughter of Rev. Samuel Street. He studied with his uncle Samuel Hall and graduated from Yale College in 1747, a tradition in his family. He was a nephew of Anne Law, daughter of Gov. Jonathan Law, cousin of Dr. William Brenton Hall, and a grandnephew of Capt. Theophilus Yale of the Yale family. In 1749, he was called to the pulpit of Stratfield Parish (now Bridgeport, Connecticut). His pastorate was a stormy one: an outspoken group of parishioners opposed his ordination; in 1751, he was dismissed after charges against his moral character which, according to one biography, "were supported by proof and also by his own confession." He continued to preach for two more years, filling vacant pulpits, while he studied medicine and taught school.

In 1752, he married Abigail Burr of Fairfield, Connecticut; she died the following year. In 1757, he married Mary Osborne. He migrated to South Carolina and established himself as a physician at Dorchester, South Carolina, near Charleston, a community settled by Congregationalist migrants from Dorchester, Massachusetts, decades earlier. When these settlers moved to the Midway District – now Liberty County – in Georgia, Hall accompanied them. Hall soon became one of the leading citizens of the newly founded town of Sunbury.

== Revolutionary War ==
On the eve of the American Revolution, St. John's Parish, in which Sunbury was located, was a hotbed of radical sentiment in a predominantly Loyalist colony. Though Georgia was not initially represented in the First Continental Congress, through Hall's influence the parish was persuaded to send a delegate to Philadelphia to the Second Continental Congress. Hall was delegated and was admitted to a seat in the Congress in 1775. He was one of the three Georgians and one of four doctors to sign the document of Independence.

In January 1779, Sunbury was burned by the British. Hall's family fled to the North, where they remained until the British evacuation in 1782. Hall then returned to Georgia, settling in Savannah. In January 1783, he was elected governor of the state – a position that he held for one year. While governor, Hall advocated the chartering of a state university, believing that education, particularly religious education, would result in a more virtuous citizenry. His efforts led to the chartering of the University of Georgia in 1785. At the expiration of his term as governor, he resumed his medical practice.

== Death and legacy ==
In 1790, Hall moved to a plantation at Shell Bluff in Burke County, Georgia, on the South Carolina border, where he died on October 19 at the age of 66. Hall's widow died in November 1798.

Hall is memorialized in Georgia where Hall County, Georgia, bears his name; and in Connecticut, his native state, where the town of Wallingford honored him by naming a high school after its distinguished native son. Elementary schools in Liberty County, Georgia, and in Hall County, Georgia, are also named for him. Signers Monument, a granite obelisk in front of the courthouse in Augusta, Georgia, memorializes Hall along with Button Gwinnett and George Walton as Georgians who signed the Declaration of Independence. His remains were re-interred there in 1848 after being exhumed from his original grave on his plantation in Burke County.

== See also ==
- Memorial to the 56 Signers of the Declaration of Independence
- Founding Fathers of the United States

== Notes ==
Political offices
Preceded by John Martin	Governor of Georgia; 1783–1784	Succeeded by John Houstoun
