= Midway, Georgia =

- City
- Motto: "A growing city with a hometown feel"
- Location in Liberty County and the state of Georgia
- Coordinates: 31°48′00″N 81°24′44″W
- Country: United States
- State: Georgia
- County: Liberty
- Settled: 1752
- Incorporated: 1925

Government

Area
  - Total: 6.44 sq mi (16.68 km^{2})
  - Land: 6.44 sq mi (16.67 km^{2})
  - Water: 0.0039 sq mi (0.01 km^{2})
- Elevation: 9.8 ft (3 m)

Population (2020)
  - Total: 2,141
  - Density: 332.6/sq mi (128.42/km^{2})
- Time zone: UTC-5 (Eastern (EST))
  - Summer (DST): UTC-4 (EDT)
- ZIP code: 31320
- Area code: 912
- FIPS code: 13-51352
- GNIS feature ID: 0356389
- Website: historicmidway.com

Midway is a city in Liberty County, Georgia, United States. It is a part of the Hinesville-Fort Stewart metropolitan statistical area. The population was 2,141 in 2020.

Midway has several museums, including the Midway Museum and the Dorchester Academy Museum. The Midway Historic District is listed on the National Register of Historic Places.

== History ==
Declaration of Independence Signers from Georgia

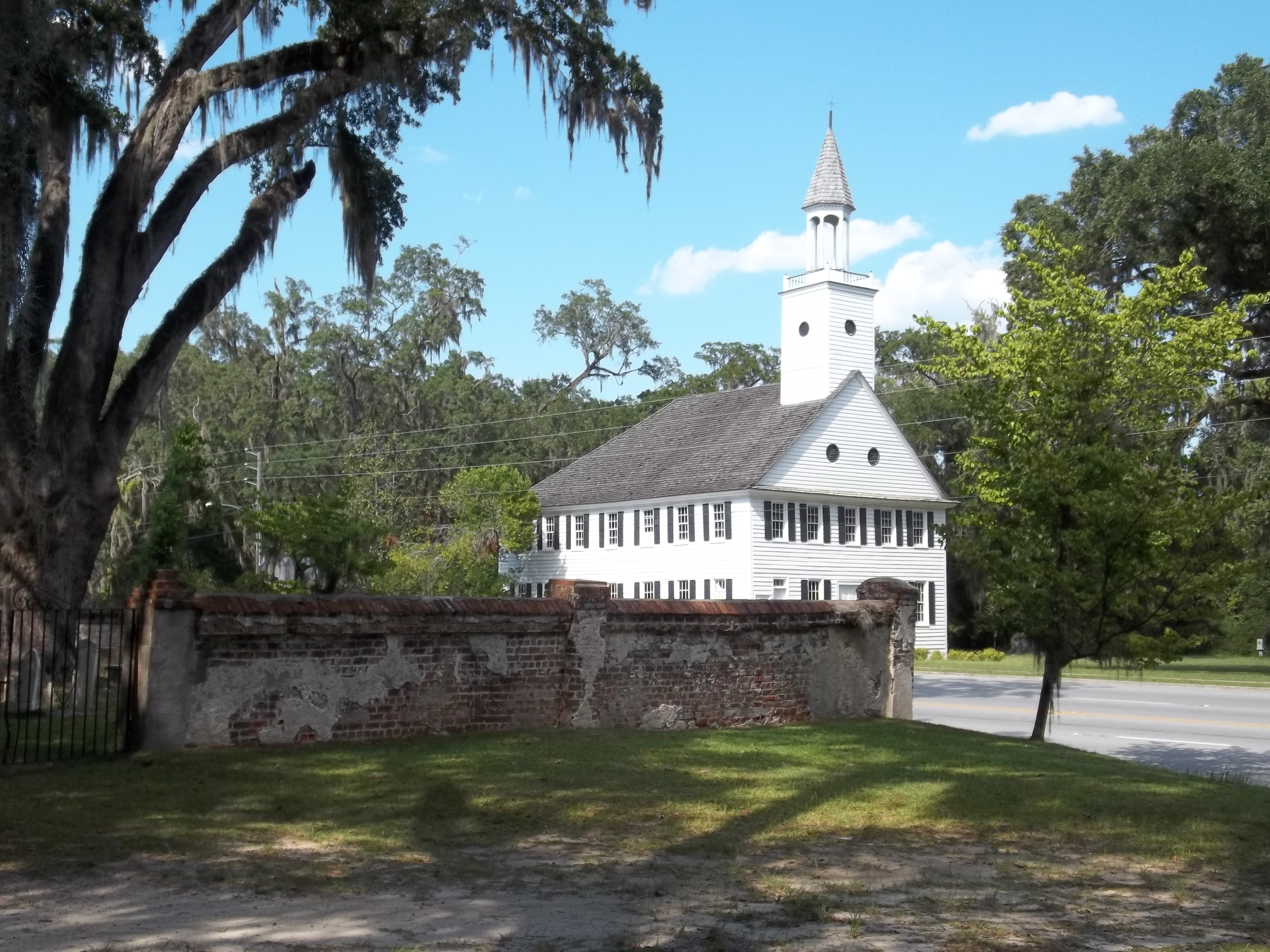
Midway Congregational Church and Midway Cemetery

Midway's history dates back to the 18th century. Puritans migrated to St. John's Parish, Georgia, from Dorchester, South Carolina, in 1752 and established several settlements, including what became the Midway community. The Council of Georgia granted them 31,950 acres (129.3 km^{2}), as colonial officials wanted a large number of settlers in the area to help protect them from the Creek Indians. The original Midway settlers were primarily rice planters and developed a strong agricultural economy, aided by the 1,500 slaves they brought from South Carolina.

The city of Midway was incorporated in 1925.

In 1973, the Midway Historic District, encompassing the Midway Congregational Church, Midway Cemetery, Midway Museum, and the Old Sunbury Road, was added to the National Register of Historic Places.

== Geography ==
Midway is located in eastern Liberty County at 31°48′00″N 81°24′44″W (31.799873, -81.412298). The current city limits include the former unincorporated community of Dorchester. The city limits extend east to include Exit 76 on Interstate 95, at the eastern terminus of U.S. Route 84. Via I-95 it is 32 miles (51 km) northeast to Savannah and 45 miles (72 km) south to Brunswick. US 84 leads west from I-95 through Midway 15 miles (24 km) to Hinesville, the Liberty county seat. To the east from I-95, Islands Highway continues 10 miles (16 km) to Colonels Island among the Atlantic coastal marshes.

According to the United States Census Bureau, Midway has a total area of 6.4 square miles (16.7 km^{2}), of which 1.74 acres (7,053 m^{2}), or 0.04%, are water.

== Demographics ==
Historical population
Census	Pop.	Note	%±
1930	42		—
1940	96		128.6%
1950	228		137.5%
1960	240		5.3%
1970	167		−30.4%
1980	457		173.7%
1990	863		88.8%
2000	1,100		27.5%
2010	2,121		92.8%
2020	2,141		0.9%
U.S. Decennial Census

=== Racial and ethnic composition ===
Midway city, Georgia – Racial and ethnic composition Note: the US Census treats Hispanic/Latino as an ethnic category. This table excludes Latinos from the racial categories and assigns them to a separate category. Hispanics/Latinos may be of any race.
Race / Ethnicity (NH = Non-Hispanic)	Pop 2000	Pop 2010	Pop 2020	% 2000	% 2010	% 2020
White alone (NH)	631	952	871	57.36%	44.88%	40.68%
Black or African American alone (NH)	404	971	951	36.73%	45.78%	44.42%
Native American or Alaska Native alone (NH)	6	4	5	0.55%	0.19%	0.23%
Asian alone (NH)	14	22	26	1.27%	1.04%	1.21%
Native Hawaiian or Pacific Islander alone (NH)	2	1	0	0.18%	0.05%	0.00%
Other race alone (NH)	0	9	9	0.00%	0.42%	0.42%
Mixed race or Multiracial (NH)	17	52	113	1.55%	2.45%	5.28%
Hispanic or Latino (any race)	26	110	166	2.36%	5.19%	7.75%
Total	1,100	2,121	2,141	100.00%	100.00%	100.00%

=== 2020 census ===
As of the 2020 census, Midway had a population of 2,141. The median age was 35.0 years. 25.1% of residents were under the age of 18 and 9.1% of residents were 65 years of age or older. For every 100 females there were 88.6 males, and for every 100 females age 18 and over there were 83.1 males age 18 and over.

There were 457 families residing in the city.

0.0% of residents lived in urban areas, while 100.0% lived in rural areas.

There were 780 households in Midway, of which 38.5% had children under the age of 18 living in them. Of all households, 49.7% were married-couple households, 14.6% were households with a male householder and no spouse or partner present, and 28.7% were households with a female householder and no spouse or partner present. About 21.1% of all households were made up of individuals and 6.3% had someone living alone who was 65 years of age or older.

There were 845 housing units, of which 7.7% were vacant. The homeowner vacancy rate was 1.6% and the rental vacancy rate was 8.2%.

== Industry ==
Midway has an industrial park with nine manufacturing facilities. In 2007, Target Corporation opened a 1,500,000-square-foot (140,000 m^{2}) regional distribution center, with two sections to the facility being present: Tradeport East and Tradeport West

== Culture ==
The Midway Museum is home to documents, exhibits, and furnishings associated with the Midway Society from the Colonial period through its last meeting in December 1865. The Midway Museum was Georgia's first colonial museum.

=== Lemonade stand shutdown ===
In July 2011 Midway received national attention after city police shut down a lemonade stand run by young girls attempting to earn money for a waterpark trip. Police and city officials maintained the girls were required to obtain a business license. Neighboring Richmond Hill allowed the girls to set up their lemonade stand at its first farmer's market later that month.

=== In the media ===
The 2014 award-winning independent film A Promise was filmed in Liberty County.

In 1980 key scenes for the Italian horror film City of the Living Dead were shot within Midway Cemetery, across State Route 17 from Midway Congregational Church.

== Education ==
Public education is provided by the Liberty County School District. Public schools located in Midway are:

- Liberty Elementary School (grades K through 5)
- Midway Middle School (grades 6 through 8)

== Notable people ==
- Moses Allen, minister (d. 1779)
- Benjamin Andrew, planter (d. 1790)
- Daniel Baker, Presbyterian minister (d. 1857)
- Nathan Brownson, physician and statesman (d. 1796)
- Lyman Hall, physician and statesman (d. 1790)
- Abiel Holmes, clergyman and historian (d. 1837)
- Raekwon McMillan, American football linebacker (b. 1995)
- Daniel Stewart, politician and brigadier general, (d. 1829)
- John W. Wilcox Jr., rear admiral in the U.S. Navy (d. 1942)
