= Midway Congregational Church =

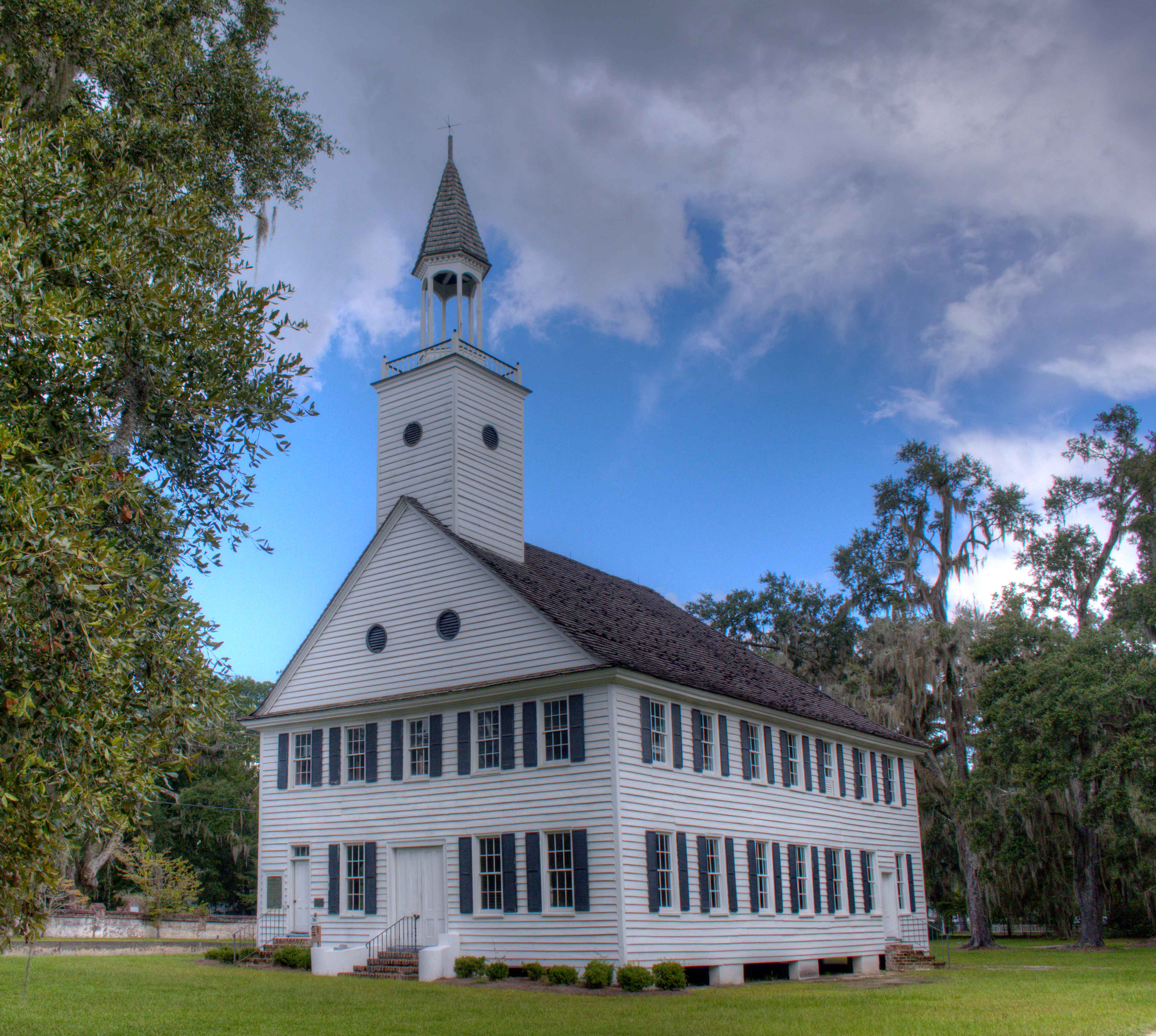
- The church in 2018
- Midway Congregational Church
- 31°48′22″N 81°25′49″W
- Location: Midway, Georgia
- Country: United States

Architecture
- Completed: 1792 (234 years ago)

Midway Congregational Church is a historic church completed in 1792. Located beside U.S. Route 17 in Midway, Georgia, the church and its adjacent cemetery were added to the National Register of Historic Places in 1973. They are part of the Midway Historic District.

Annually in April, the Midway Society holds a service at the church, commemorating the town's 1752 settlement. In 1754, a temporary structure, made of logs, was located around 0.75 miles (1.21 km) east of the present church, near Thomas Mallard's plantation. That building was replaced, on land purchased from John Stevens, by a colonial-style church two years later. It was destroyed by the British during the Revolutionary War. Today's structure was completed in 1792. There were originally several cottages around the church, in which members would meet for lunch between services to fill the time, since several lived many miles away.

== See also ==
- National Register of Historic Places listings in Georgia
