= Charles Jones =

Charles, Charlie, Charley or Chuck Jones may refer to:

== Academia ==
- Charles I. Jones, professor of economics at Stanford University
- Charles O. Jones (1931–2024), scholar of American politics
- Charles W. Jones (medievalist) (1905–1989), medievalist scholar

== Arts and entertainment ==
=== Music ===
- Charles Jones (composer) (1910–1997), Canadian composer
- Charles Price Jones (1865–1949), minister and composer
- Charlie Jones (musician) (born 1965), British bass-guitarist
- Charlie Jones (singer) (born 1999), singer of Stereo Kicks
- Sir Charles Jones (born 1973), American blues and Southern soul singer
- Julio Foolio (1998–2024), American rapper, born Charles Jones

=== Other arts ===
- Chuck Jones (Charles Martin Jones, 1912–2002), American animator, director, and producer
- Charles Jones (c. 1889–1942), American actor better known as Buck Jones
- Charles Jones (photographer) (1866–1959), gardener and photographer
- Charles Henry Jones (editor) (1848–1913), American journalist, editor, and political figure
- Charles Hollis Jones (born 1945), American artist and furniture designer
- Charles Pickman Jones (1808–1883), founded a ceramics factory in Seville
- Charlie Jones (actor) (born 1996), EastEnders actor

== Politics, law, and military ==
=== United Kingdom ===
- Charles Jones (MP for Beaumaris), Welsh MP between 1624 and 1640
- Sydney Jones (businessman) (Charles Sydney Jones, 1872–1947), English shipowner and Liberal Party politician
- Charles Jones (British Army officer) (1906–1988), British Army general
- Charles William Jones (1836–1908), Welsh politician and magistrate
- Sir Charles Ernest Jones (1892–1953), British colonial civil servant

=== United States ===
- Charles A. Jones (police), chief of police of the Los Angeles Police Department
- Charles Alvin Jones (1887–1966), U.S. federal judge
- Charles C. Jones Jr. (1831–1893), Georgia politician, attorney, and author
- Charles E. Jones (judge) (1935–2018), chief justice of the Arizona Supreme Court, 2002–2005
- Charles G. Jones (1856–1911), American urban developer and politician
- Charles Henry Jones (editor) (1848–1913), American journalist, editor, and political figure
- Charles M. Jones (Alaska politician) (1921–2002), Alaskan politician
- Charles M. Jones (Georgia politician) (1930–2007), member of the Georgia House of Representatives
- Charles Pinckney Jones (1845–1914), American politician in Virginia
- Charles S. Jones (1824–1889), American businessman and politician
- Charles W. Jones (1834–1897), U.S. senator from Florida
- J. Charles Jones (1937–2019), American civil rights leader and Student Nonviolent Coordinating Committee co-founder
- Chuck Jones (politician) (born 1971), American politician in the South Dakota Senate
- Charlie Jones, Chief Shakes VII of the Tlingit people 1916–1944

=== Elsewhere ===
- Charles Jones (Victorian politician) (1828–1903), Australian politician
- Charles Jones (Australian politician) (1917–2003), Australian politician and government minister
- Charles Jones (Upper Canada politician) (1781–1840), Canadian merchant, politician
- Charles E. Jones (politician) (1881–1948), mayor of Vancouver
- Charles Jones, 5th Viscount Ranelagh (1761–1800), Irish peer and Royal Navy officer

== Religion ==
- Charles Colcock Jones (1804–1863), Presbyterian clergyman, planter, and missionary to slaves
- Charles Price Jones (1865–1949), minister and composer
- Charles Irving Jones III (born 1943), Episcopal prelate

== Sports ==
=== American football ===
- Charles Jones (American football coach) (born 1960/1961), American football player and coach
- Charles Jones (tight end) (born 1996), American football player
- Charlie Jones (American football, born 1972), American football wide receiver
- Charlie Jones (American football, born 1998), American football wide receiver
- Charley Jones (American football) (1929–2000), American football defensive end

=== Association football ===
- Charlie Jones (footballer, born 1899) (1899–1966), Welsh international footballer
- Charlie Jones (footballer, born 1911) (1911–1985), Welsh-born footballer
- Wilson Jones (footballer, born 1914) (Charles Wilson Jones, 1914–1986), Welsh international football centre forward
- Charles Jones (footballer) (1888–?), English-born football outside left who played for Birmingham and Bristol Rovers

=== Baseball ===
- Bumpus Jones (Charles Leander Jones, 1870–1938), 1890s baseball pitcher
- Charley Jones (1852–1911), American baseball outfielder
- Charlie Jones (infielder) (1861–1922), baseball infielder
- Charlie Jones (outfielder) (1876–1947), baseball outfielder

=== Basketball ===
- Charles Jones (basketball, born 1957), "Gadget" Jones, American basketball player with Washington Bullets (1985–93) and Houston Rockets
- Charles Jones (basketball, born 1962), American basketball player with Phoenix Suns, Portland Trail Blazers and Washington Bullets (1988–89)
- Charles Jones (basketball, born 1975), American basketball player with Chicago Bulls and Los Angeles Clippers

=== Cricket ===
- Charles Jones (Australian cricketer) (1870–1957), Australian cricketer
- Charles Jones (Lancashire cricketer) (1853–1904), English cricketer
- Charles Jones (West Indian cricketer) (1902–1959), West Indian cricketer
- Ian Jones (sportsman, born 1934) (born Charles Ian Jones, 1934–2016), English cricketer and field hockey player

=== Rugby union ===
- Charlie Jones (rugby union, born 1880) (1880–1908), South African rugby union international
- Charles Jones (rugby union, born 1893) (1893–1960), Wales international rugby union player

=== Other sports ===
- Charlie Jones (Australian footballer) (1888–1946), Australian rules footballer
- Ian Jones (sportsman, born 1934) (1934–2016, Charles Ian McMillan Jones), British Olympic field hockey player
- Charlie Jones (sportscaster) (1930–2008), American sports announcer
- Deacon Jones (runner) (Charles Nicholas Jones, 1934–2007), American steeplechase runner

== Other fields ==
- Charles "Buffalo" Jones (1844–1919), American rancher and conservationist
- Charles Colcock Jones (1804–1863), Presbyterian clergyman, planter, and missionary to slaves
- Charles Edward Jones (1952–2001), American astronaut
- Charles Foster Jones (1879–1942), American weather observer who was executed by Japanese soldiers during the Aleutian Islands campaign
- Charles Handfield Jones (1819–1890), English physician
- Charles Henry Jones (businessman) (1855–1933), American businessman and philanthropist
- Charles Jones (architect) (1830–1913), Ealing's first architect, engineer and surveyor
- Charles Jones (engineer) (fl. 1773 – c. 1796), English civil engineer
- Charles Larimore Jones (1932–2006), U.S. Air Force architect
- Charles Lloyd Jones (1878–1958), Australian businessman and patron of the arts
- Charles Pickman Jones (1808–1883), founded a ceramics factory in Seville
- Charles Stansfeld Jones (1886–1950), occultist and ceremonial magician

== Fictional ==
- Charlie Jones (Fireman Sam), a character in Fireman Sam
