= Pickman =

Pickman is a surname. Notable people with the surname include:

- Benjamin T. Pickman (1790–1835), American politician
- Benjamin Pickman Jr. (1763–1843), American politician
- Dudley Leavitt Pickman (1779–1846), American merchant
- Charles Pickman Jones (1808-1883), English-Spanish entrepreneur
- Paul Israel Pickman (born 1958), American film director
