= Journal of Literature, Science and Arts =

Journal of Literature, Science and Arts may refer to:

- Appletons' Journal of Literature, Science and Art
- Chambers's Journal of Literature, Science and Arts
