= Appletons' Journal =

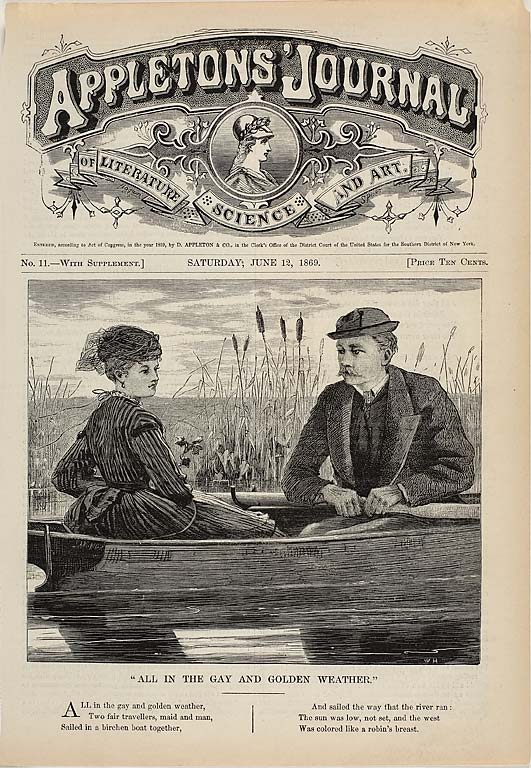
June 12, 1869 cover with art by Winslow Homer

Appletons' Journal was an American magazine of literature, science, and arts. Published by D. Appleton & Company, New York city, and debuting on April 3, 1869, its first editor was Edward L. Youmans, followed by Robert Carter, Oliver Bell Bunce, and Charles Henry Jones. It was published weekly until June 26, 1876, then monthly from July 1876 until its final issue December 1881.
