= Oliver Bell Bunce =

American dramatist (1828–1890)

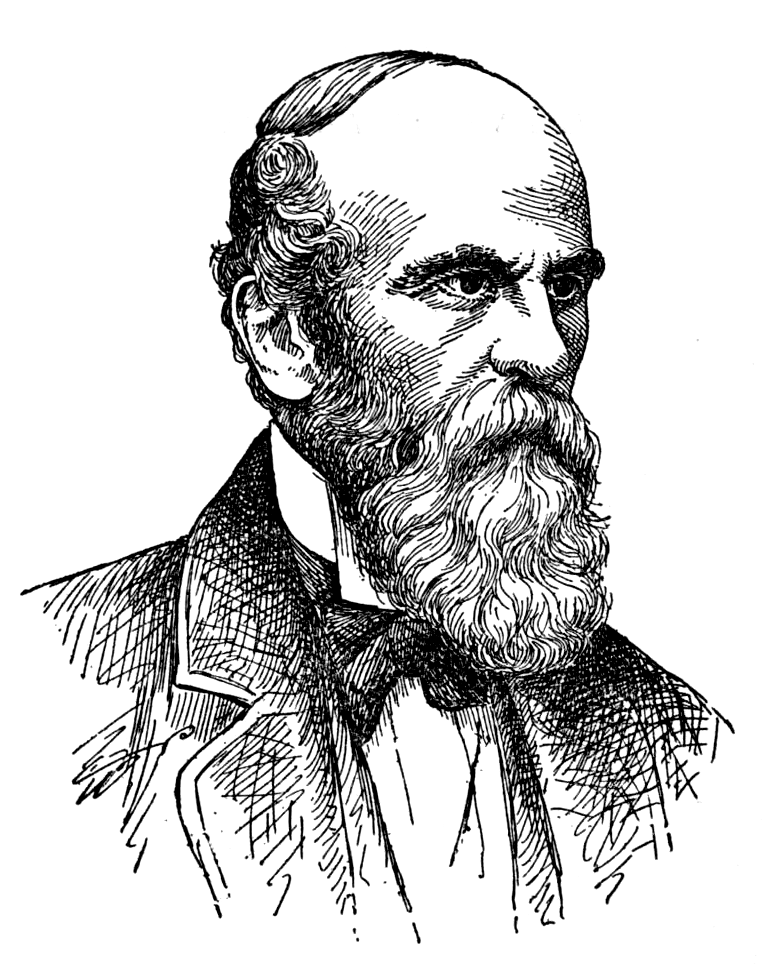
- Born: February 8, 1828; New York City
- Died: May 15, 1890 (aged 62); New York City

Oliver Bell Bunce (February 8, 1828 – May 15, 1890) was an American author, editor, and playwright.

== Life ==
He was born in New York City, in his youth he joined his uncle's stationery house Jansen & Bell.

While connected with this house he began writing plays, several of which were brought out. Fate or the Prophecy, a tragedy in blank verso, and Marco Bozzaris were played by James W. Wallack, and Love in '76, a comedy, was played by Laura Keene in the leading woman's role. He also wrote a series of historical sketches which were afterward collected and published in a volume entitled The Romance of the Revolution. In 1854 Bunce and his brother established a publishing house with the firm name of Bunce & Brother. This firm published Ann S. Stephens's Monthly and Bunce acted as its editor. But the firm not being successful for lack of sufficient capital, was dissolved after a few years and he became manager of the publishing house of James G. Gregory, a position which he retained until some years after the death of the senior member of the firm. For a short time he was connected with the house of Harper & Brothers as literary reader. In 1867 he formed a connection with D. Appleton & Company, which continued until his death. When Appletons' Journal was established in 1869, Bunce was made associate editor, and upon the retirement of Robert Carter in 1872, he became its chief editor. Bunce also authored several books, novels, and essays of dramatic criticism. He died in New York City. After his death, his widow published articles and recipes under the name Mrs. Oliver Bell Bunce.
