= Erskine Clarke =

American historian

Thomas Erskine Clarke is a Professor Emeritus of American Religious History at Columbia Theological Seminary, best known for his books Dwelling Place (Yale, 2005) and By the Rivers of Water (Basic, 2013).

== Life ==
Erskine Clarke graduated from the University of South Carolina in 1963, received a Master of Divinity from Columbia Theological Seminary in 1966 and a PhD from Union Presbyterian Theological Seming in 1970. He spent the 1966–67 academic year at the University of Basel in Switzerland. He has lectured or served as a consultant at a number of places including Wesley Theological Seminary, Washington, D.C.; McCormick Theological Seminary, Chicago; Garrett Theological Seminary, Evanston, Illinois; United Theological College of the West Indies, Kingston, Jamaica; University of Debrecen, Debrecen, Hungary; Nanjing Theological Seminary, Nanjing, China; and University of Stellenbosch, Stellenbosch, South Africa. During the last several years he has lectured at Clare Hall, Cambridge University of Cambridge; Queens College, University of London; Yale University; The University of Virginia; The Georgia Historical Society; and The Morris Museum of Art, Augusta, Ga. In 2005 he was a visiting fellow, Clare Hall, Cambridge at the University of Cambridge, and has been elected a Life Member of Clare Hall. He has been a frequent lecturer for seminars sponsored by the National Endowment for the Humanities. He is married to Nancy Legare Warren Clarke.

== Writings ==
Clarke's primary scholarly interest has focused on religion and slavery in the American South. His publications include Wrestlin’ Jacob: A Portrait of Religion in the Old South (1979); republished by the University of Alabama Press with a new Introduction in 2000; The Seminary Presidency in Protestant Theological Seminaries published in 1995 as a monograph in a special supplement of Theological Education by the Association of Theological Schools in the U. S. and Canada; Our Southern Zion: Calvinism in the South Carolina Low Country, 1690-1990 (University of Alabama Press, 1996). Wrestlin’Jacob was selected by Choice magazine of the American Library Association as an Academic Book of the Year. He received Author of the Year Award for Wrestlin’ Jacob from the old Dixie Council of Authors and Journalists. Our Southern Zion received the Francis Makemie Award from the Presbyterian Historical Society for “the most outstanding published book-length contribution to American Presbyterian or Reformed history.” In 2019 the University of South Carolina Press published his To Count Our Days: A History of Columbia Theological Seminary.

=== Dwelling Place (2005) ===
His book Dwelling Place: A Plantation Epic (2005, Yale University Press) is an "upstairs-downstairs" history of a white, slave-owing family and of a black enslaved family over four generations. At the center of the white family was a Presbyterian minister, Charles Colcock Jones, who became known among whites as the “Apostle to the Negro Slaves” for his work among the Gullah-speaking people of the Georgia lowcountry and his advocacy of humane treatment of slaves. The focus of the “downstairs” story is on the family of Lizzy Jones, who helped create a remarkable African–American community and struggled in a variety of ways against the deep oppression of slavery. Dwelling Place received the Bancroft Prize given by Columbia University for a work "of exceptional merit" in American history; the 2006 Bell Prize from the Georgia Historical Society for the best book on Georgia History; and a Mary Lawton Hodges prize from the Institute of Southern Studies, University of South Carolina; Steven Hahn, in his review in The New Republic called Dwelling Place "one of the finest studies of American slavery every written," and David Brion Davis of Yale called it in the American Historical Review "one of the best and most important studies of American slavery I have ever read."

=== By the Rivers of Water (2013) ===
Clarke's book By the Rivers of Water (2013, Basic) is the story of a remarkable Southern couple who freed in the 1830s their inherited slaves and helped them settle in the African American colony at Cape Palmas, Liberia. John Leighton Wilson and Jane Bayard Wilson served as missionaries, first at Cape Palmas and then in Gabon, for seventeen years. They were vigorous opponents of the international slave trade and French imperialism in Gabon. Leighton Wilson wrote the first dictionary and grammar of the Grebo and Mpongwe languages and reported on the stunning achievement of the Vey in developing their own alphabet. His book, Western Africa, was a careful and appreciative study of West African cultures and societies that sought to refute the claims of a rising scientific racism.

The Dallas Morning News called the book an "Engrossing, elegantly written history...a memorable book" and the Library Journal, Starred Review, said it is “Brimming with insights about interconnected individuals, peoples, and societies struggling with conscience and dignity to make moral choices amid clashing, if not collapsing, worlds, this work is required reading for anyone interested in a sympathetic understanding of early U.S. missionaries in West Africa, the perils of the U.S. colonization movement, Civil War tensions, or Atlantic world connections.”

== Awards ==
- 2006 Bancroft Prize, Dwelling Place
- 2006 Mary Lawton Hodges Book Prize in Southern Studies, Dwelling Place
- 2006 Malcolm Bell Jr., and Muriel Barrow Bell Award, Dwelling Place
- Choice magazine of the American Library Association Academic Book of the Year, Wrestlin' Jacob

== Works ==
- Wrestlin' Jacob: A Portrait of Religion in Antebellum Georgia and the Carolina Low Country(1979;1999)
- The Seminary Presidency in Protestant Theological Seminaries (1995)
- Our Southern Zion: A History of Calvinism in the South Carolina Low Country, 1690-1990(1996)
- Exilic Preaching: Testimony for Christian Exiles in an Increasingly Hostile Culture(1998)
- Dwelling Place: A Plantation Epic(2005)
- By the Rivers of Water: A Nineteenth-Century Atlantic Odyssey(2013)
- To Count Our Days: A History of Columbia Theological Seminary (2019)
