= John Hart (doctor) =

American surgeon (1751–1836)

John Hart (October 13, 1751 – April 27, 1836) was an American surgeon originally from Ipswich, Massachusetts who served as a Regimental Surgeon during the American Revolution. Following the Battles of Lexington and Concord, he left his medical practice in Georgetown (now Bath) Maine to serve his newly forming country in his home state of Massachusetts.

== Revolutionary War service ==
His service began in 1775 as a member of Prescott's Regiment where he was present at the Battle of Bunker Hill and the Battle of Long Island. He served as its surgeon from May to August 1775. From there he was incorporated into the short-lived Massachusetts Seventh Continental Infantry (from to January to December 1776).

In January 1777, he was personally assigned to the newly formed Col Bailey's 2nd Massachusetts Regiment by Col Bailey himself (recreated today by the modern Col Bailey's 2nd Massachusetts Regiment). He remained the Regimental Surgeon to the 2nd Massachusetts Regiment for the duration of the war until it was disbanded in 1783. At which point he remained in the service of his country as a reserve surgeon to Col Henry Jackson's Regiment after the war.

In 1784, he was elected by the officers and men of his former regiment (The 2nd Massachusetts Regiment) to travel from Westpoint, NY to Boston on horseback to retrieve $3000.00 in gold slated for use as the back-pay owed them by Congress. Upon his successful return, he was to forfeit the money to the regimental paymaster for proper disbursement. However, he soon discovered the paymaster was not intending to pay the men, but had other plans for that money. It was at this point he took it upon himself to pay the men directly from that money, and was summarily chastised by Congress for this "reprehensible act".

His service to the army lasted over 9 years in total until his honorable discharge in 1784.

In association with over 200 former officers of the Revolution, including George Washington, Hart was one of the founders of the Society of the Cincinnati. This organization was formed to collect all the land grants from their service in the war to form what is now Ohio. This is actually the reason for the naming of the city of Cincinnati.

== Post war ==
After serving a total of 9 years and 3 months, Hart returned to Middlesex County and settled in Reading Township. It was here he opened his personal medical practice and soon was the doctor for the entire region (including Essex and Suffolk counties). When the Middlesex Medical Association formed in 1790, he was one of its prominent members. In 1792, when a major smallpox epidemic erupted in Boston, Hart was called upon to take charge of the temporary hospitals' setup in Reading, Lynn, Boston, and elsewhere. It was in these hospitals that he personally inoculated thousands of residents for smallpox in a span of only a few months.

Later in life, he was again called upon to represent the Reading citizenry in the Massachusetts General Court for a term of 8 years. He was also a long-standing member of the Massachusetts Medical Society and was elected its Vice President until his death in 1836. He is interred at the Old Burial Ground in Wakefield, Massachusetts, beside his wife and family.
