= Francis Bowen =

American philosopher, writer and educationalist (1811–1890)

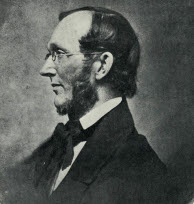
Francis Bowen

Francis Bowen (/ˈboʊən/ BOH-ən; September 8, 1811 – January 22, 1890) was an American philosopher, writer, and educationalist.

== Biography ==
He was born in Charlestown, Massachusetts. He was educated at Mayhew School, Boston, Phillips Exeter Academy, and Harvard University, graduating from the latter in 1833. While attending Harvard, he taught school at Hampton Falls, New Hampshire, and Concord, Lexington and Northborough, Massachusetts. After graduating from Harvard, he taught for two years at Phillips Exeter Academy, returning to Harvard from 1835 to 1839 to tutor in Greek and teach intellectual philosophy and political economy. In 1839 he went to Europe, and, while living in Paris, met Sismondi, de Gerando, and other scholars. He returned to Cambridge in 1841 and devoted himself to literature. He was editor and proprietor of the North American Review from 1843 to 1854, writing, during this time, about one fourth of the articles in it. In 1848 and 1849, he delivered lectures before the Lowell Institute on the application of metaphysical and ethical science to the evidences of religion.

In 1850 he was appointed McLean professor of history at Harvard, but his appointment was disapproved by the board of overseers on account of political opinions he had expressed concerning the Hungarian revolution of 1848. Bowen had written two articles on Hungary for his North American Review: The War of Races in Hungary (January 1850) and The Rebellion of the Slavonic, Wallachian, and German Hungarians against the Magyars (January 1851). Robert Carter wrote a series of articles for the Boston Atlas in reply. These articles, republished in a pamphlet as The Hungarian Controversy (Boston, 1852), are said to have been the cause of the rejection by the overseers of Bowen's appointment.

In the winter of 1850, Bowen lectured again before the Lowell Institute on political economy, and in 1852 on the origin and development of the English and American constitutions. In 1853, on the election of James Walker to the presidency of Harvard, Bowen was appointed his successor as Alford professor of natural religion, moral philosophy and civil polity. This time the appointment was approved almost unanimously by the overseers, and he occupied the chair until 1889. After 1858, he lectured before the Lowell Institute on the English metaphysicians and philosophers from Francis Bacon to Sir William Hamilton.

In 1876 he was a member of the United States Silver Commission which was appointed to consider currency reform. In 1877, he wrote the minority report in which he opposed the restoration of the double standard and the remonetization of silver. In 1888, he was asked to endorse the Republican Party's tariff platform, but replied by publishing an article (Nation, November 8, 1888) denouncing the current tariff as tyranny.

In philosophy and metaphysics, Bowen upheld the views of George Berkeley and John Locke and opposed those of Immanuel Kant, Johann Gottlieb Fichte, Victor Cousin, Auguste Comte, and John Stuart Mill. The latter replied to his criticism in the 3rd edition of his Logic. In political economy, Bowen opposed the doctrines of Adam Smith on free trade, Thomas Malthus on population, and David Ricardo on rent. He took pains to trace the influence of our form of government and condition of society upon economical questions. A significant philosophical interest was harmonizing philosophy with Christianity. Piety marked his writing and teaching.

According to Quinton, the philosopher Chauncey Wright was Bowen's pupil.

He died in Boston, Massachusetts.

== Works ==
- Lives of Sir William Phips (1837), Baron von Steuben (1838), James Otis (1846) and Benjamin Lincoln (1847) in Jared Sparks's Library of American Biography
- Virgil, with English Notes (Boston, 1842)
- Critical Essays on the History and Present Condition of Speculative Philosophy (Boston, 1842)
- Lectures on the "Application of Metaphysical and Ethical Science to the Evidences of Religion" (Lowell Institute Lectures, 1849; revised ed. 1855)
- Lectures on Political Economy (1850)
- Dugald Stewart, Philosophy of the Human Mind, editor (1854)
- Documents of the Constitution of England and America, from Magna Charta to the Federal Constitution of 1789 (Cambridge, 1854)
- The Principles of Political Economy applied to the Condition, Resources and Institutions of the American People (1856)
- Alexis de Tocqueville, Democracy in America, Henry Reeve, tr., revised edition (2 vols., Cambridge, 1862)
- A Treatise on Logic (1864)
- American Political Economy, with remarks on the finances since the beginning of the Civil War (1870)
- Modern Philosophy from Descartes to Schopenhauer and Hartmann (1877)
- Gleanings from a Literary Life, 1838-1880 (1880).
- A Layman's Study of the English Bible, considered in its Literary and Secular Aspect (1886)
- A Theory of Creation: A Review of 'Vestiges of the Natural History of Creation authored by Robert Chambers in 1844' (1845)

== See also ==
- American philosophy
- List of American philosophers
- Mary Traill Spence Lowell Putnam
