= The Religious Instruction of the Negroes in the United States =

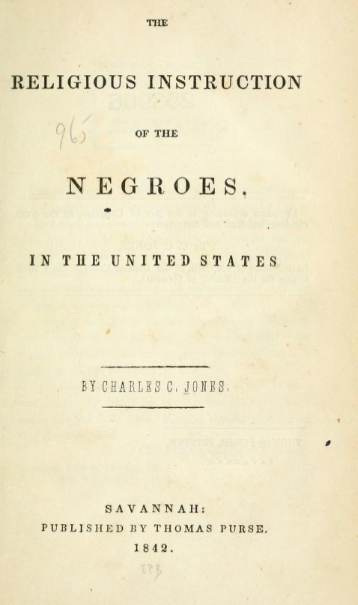
- Title page for The Religious Instruction of the Negroes in the United States (1842)
- Author: Charles Colcock Jones Sr.
- Language: English
- Genre: Non-fiction
- Publication date: 1843
- Publication place: United States

The Religious Instruction of the Negroes in the United States by Charles Colcock Jones Sr. was published in 1843. The book includes four parts, the first giving a history of the African slave trade. Colcock, himself a minister and plantation owner, called on slave owners and ministers to provide religious instruction to slaves.
