= Charles Jones (Australian cricketer) =

Australian cricketer

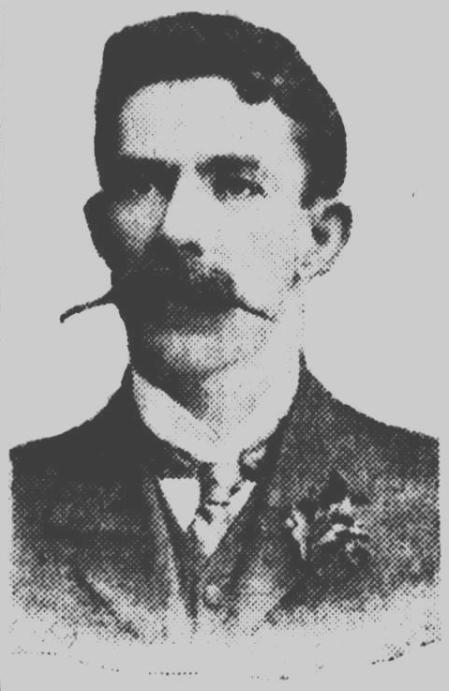

Personal information
- Born: 9 February 1870; Melbourne, Australia
- Died: 25 March 1957 (aged 87); Melbourne, Australia

Domestic team information
- Years: Team
- 1906: Victoria
- Source: Cricinfo, 15 November 2015

Charles Jones (9 February 1870 – 25 March 1957) was an Australian cricketer. He played one first-class cricket match for Victoria in 1906. He played for Prahran in district cricket and captained the club.

== See also ==
- List of Victoria first-class cricketers
