= Charlie Jones (rugby union, born 1880) =

South African rugby union player (b. 1880, d. 1908)

- Born: Charles Henry Jones; 24 March 1880 Kimberly, South Africa
- Died: 6 March 1908 (aged 27)
- School: Kimberly Boys High

Rugby union career
- Position: Fullback
Provincial / State sides
Years	Team	Apps	(Points)
1903	Transvaal	0	(0)
International career
Years	Team	Apps	(Points)
1903	South Africa	2	(0)
- Correct as of 1 June 2019

Charlie Jones ( 24 March 1880 – 6 Mar 1908) was a South African international rugby union player who played as a fullback.

He made 2 appearances for South Africa against the British Lions in 1903.
