= Allen French =

American writer (1870–1946)

- Born: November 28, 1870; Boston, Massachusetts, U.S.
- Died: October 6, 1946 (aged 75); Concord, Massachusetts, U.S.
- Occupations: Historian; fiction writer
- Spouse: Ellen Dorrance (died 1918) Aletta Lillibridge (m. 1922)

Academic background
- Education: Massachusetts Institute of Technology (BS); Harvard University (BA)

Academic work
- Discipline: History
- Sub-discipline: American history; History of Massachusetts
- Institutions: Harvard University

Allen French (November 28, 1870 – October 6, 1946) was an American historian and fiction author. He wrote several books on the history of the American Revolution, including The Taking of Ticonderoga in 1775 (1928), General Gage's Informers (1932), The First Year of the American Revolution (1934), and Charles I and the Puritan Upheaval (1955), as well as children's stories and historical fiction. He also edited the diary A British Fusilier in Revolutionary Boston (1926).

== Biography ==
=== Early life and education ===
Allen French was born on November 28, 1870, in Boston. His parents were Frances Maria (née Stratton) and wholesale paint salesman John James French. He attended grade school in Boston, going to Rice Primary and Grammar Schools and the Boston Latin School, before graduating from The English High School.

French obtained a Bachelor of Science from the Massachusetts Institute of Technology in 1892. After two summers studying abroad at the University of Berlin in 1892 and 1893, he attended Harvard University for his undergraduate education, obtaining a Bachelor of Arts degree. Invested in learning grammar, he would often use a dictionary or encyclopedia even during meals.

=== Academic and writing career ===
French wrote several books on the history of the American Revolution, particularly such events in his native Massachusetts. These include The Siege of Boston (1911), Old Concord (1915), The Day of Concord and Lexington (1925), and The First Year of the American Revolution (1934). In 1926, he published A British Fusilier in Revolutionary Boston, an edited volume showing the diary of Lieutenant Frederick Mackenzie (the pre-1775 portion of which is nearly lost). (Note: Reviews of this book:) One of his visits included heading to the United Kingdom to access the documents of Massachusetts colonial governor Thomas Gage, as well as obtaining photocopies of 1770s documents within the Earl of Dartmouth's family papers. In a 1946 Concord Journal article, T. Morris Longstreth called French "a born source-seeker and prospector for original documents". He produced a guidebook named Historic Concord (1924).

French often wrote children's stories and historical fiction, having started his career in the former. Some of his children's books were illustrated by painter Andrew Wyeth. He also wrote several books about Iceland, as well as a 1907 book on gardening and a history article on the Île de Ré. Overall, he wrote more than two dozen titles throughout multiple genres and audiences.

French taught at Harvard as a history instructor (1908–1913; 1919–1920). He chaired the Concord Free Public Library's library committee. He was a member of several academic societies, national and local. He was a co-founder and eventually president of the Concord Antiquarian Society. He was a founding member and vice-president of the Thoreau Society.

=== Personal life and death ===
French was twice married, first to Ellen Dorrance until her death in 1918, then to Aletta Lillibridge from 1922. He had three daughters with his first wife. He had lived in Concord since 1898, having moved to the small town due to "its fine library and its moderate scale of living". Allan Forbes reported that "though it takes three generations to make a real "Concord man," it has been said that French shared Old Concord with Emerson, Buttrick, Judge Hoar, and others." He also briefly lived in Petersham, where he remained known by the time of his death.

French was active in the American Unitarian Association, working at the First Parish in Concord as deacon and as Sunday school superintendent. He briefly volunteered as a police officer during a labor strike.

French died on October 6, 1946, in his home in Concord. Following a funeral at the First Parish, he was interred in Sleepy Hollow Cemetery. Decades after his death, the Friends of the Concord Free Public Library republished two of his books: Historic Concord in 2003 and The Day of Concord and Lexington in 2010.

== Works ==
=== Fiction ===
- The Junior Cup (1901)
- The Colonials (1902)
- Sir Marrok: A Tale of the Days of King Arthur (1902)
- The Story of Rolf and the Viking Bow (1904)
- The Barrier (1904)
- Heroes of Iceland (1905)
- The Reform of Shaun (1905)
- Pelham and His Friend Tim (1906)
- The Story of Grettir the Strong (1908)
- The Runaway (1914)
- At Plattsburg (1917) (Note: Reviews of this book:)
- The Golden Eagle (1917)
- The Hiding Places (1917)
- The Red Keep (1938)
- The Lost Baron (1940)

=== Non-fiction ===
- How to Grow Vegetables (1911)
- The Siege of Boston (1911)
- The Beginner's Garden Book (1914)
- Old Concord (1915)
- Historic Concord (1924; re-published 1942 and revised 2003)
- The Day of Concord and Lexington (1925)
  - Historic Concord and the Lexington Fight (2010; revised by Leslie Perrin Wilson)
- (ed.) A British Fusilier in Revolutionary Boston (1926; by Frederick Mackenzie)
- The Taking of Ticonderoga in 1775 (1928) (Note: Reviews of this book:)
- General Gage's Informers (1932) (Note: Reviews of this book:)
- The First Year of the American Revolution (1934) (Note: Reviews of this book:)
- The Drama of Concord (1935)
- Charles I and the Puritan Upheaval (1955) (Note: Reviews of this book:)
