= Charlie Jones (Australian footballer) =

Australian rules footballer (1888–1946)

Personal information
- Full name: Charlie Jones
- Born: 2 November 1888
- Died: 24 November 1946 (aged 58)
- Original team: Port Melbourne Juniors
- Height: 178 cm (5 ft 10 in)
- Weight: 74 kg (163 lb)

Playing career^{1}
Years	Club	Games (Goals)
1914–15	South Melbourne	7 (1)
- ^{1} Playing statistics correct to the end of 1915.

Charlie Jones (2 November 1888 – 24 November 1946) was an Australian rules footballer who played with South Melbourne in the Victorian Football League (VFL).
