= Boston Patriot (newspaper) =

Defunct newspaper in Massachusetts, US

The Boston Patriot was a semiweekly newspaper based in Boston, Massachusetts. It was founded in 1809 to promote the interests of the Democratic-Republican Party. Between 1809 and 1812, it published a series of autobiographical letters by John Adams.
