= Charles Henry Jones (editor) =

American journalist

Charles H. Jones
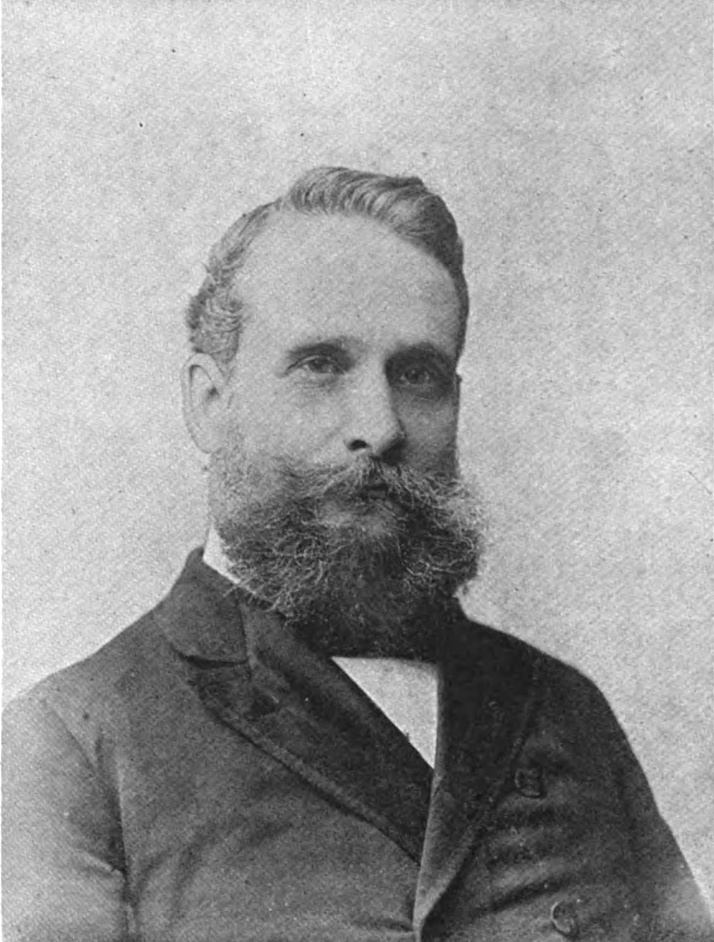
- Born: March 7, 1848; Talbotton, Georgia
- Died: January 26, 1913 (aged 64); Ospedaletti, Italy
- Occupations: Journalist, editor

Charles Henry Jones (March 7, 1848 – January 26, 1913) was an American journalist, editor, and political figure. Born in Talbotton, Georgia, at age 15 he joined the Confederate Army during the Civil War. In 1866 he moved to New York, where he edited Eclectic Magazine and Appleton's Journal. He moved to Jacksonville, Florida, in 1881, where he established the Florida Daily Times, which incorporated rival Florida Union to become the Florida Times-Union. He later was editor of St. Louis Republic, St. Louis Dispatch (1895–97) and New York World (1893–95). He was president of the National Editorial Association, and was prominent in the Democratic Party, leading the Florida Democratic Party and writing the Chicago Platform of 1896 and Kansas City Platform of 1900. He died in Ospedaletti, Italy.
