= Charles Colcock Jones =

American Presbyterian clergyman, educator, and planter (1804 – 1863)

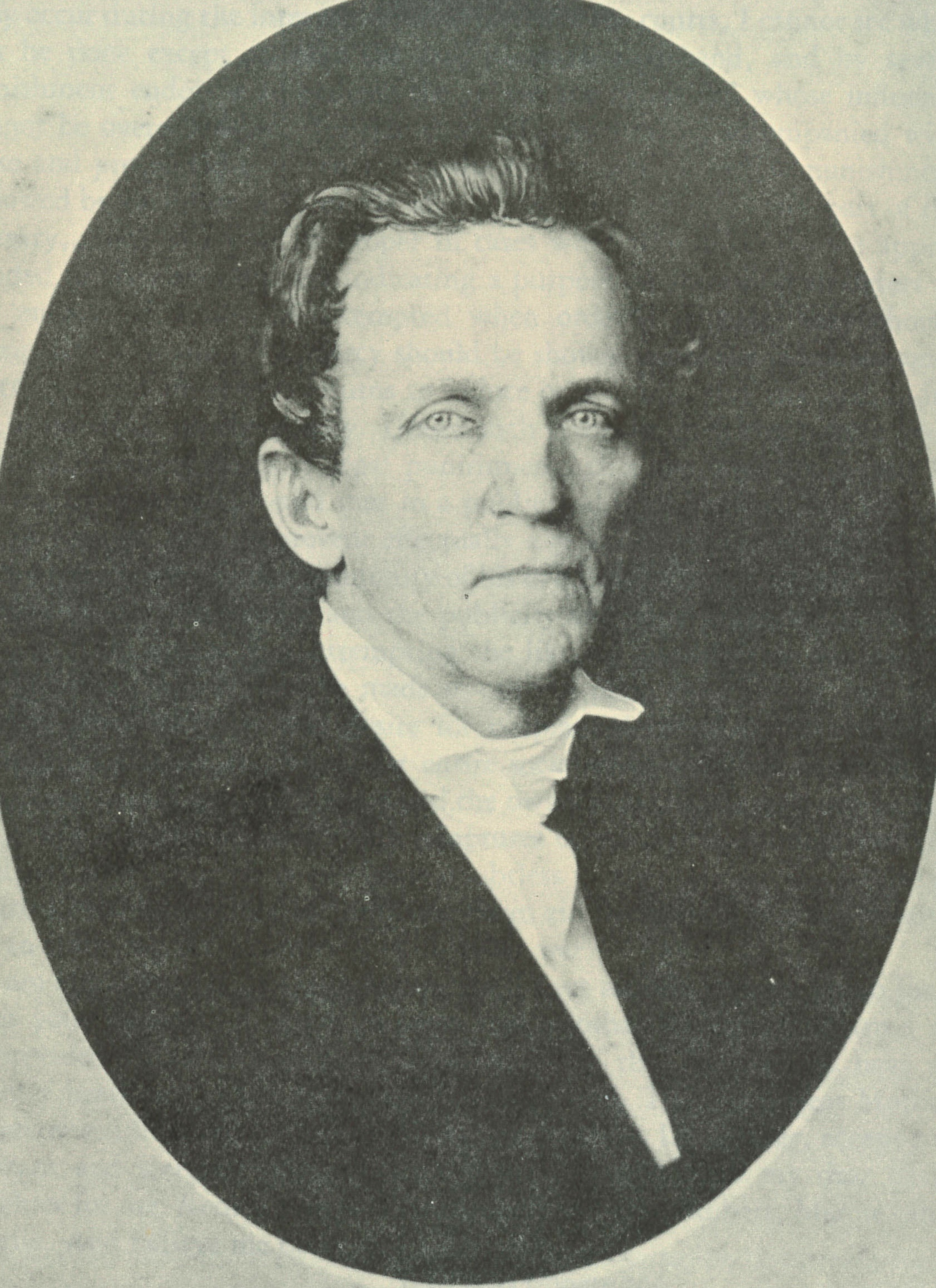
- Charles Colcock Jones (1804-1863)
- Born: December 20, 1804; Liberty County, Georgia, U.S.
- Died: March 16, 1863 (aged 58); Liberty County, Georgia, U.S.
- Resting place: Midway Cemetery, Midway, Georgia, U.S.
- Education: Phillips Academy; Andover Theological Seminary; Princeton Theological Seminary; Jefferson College
- Occupations: Planter, clergyman, educator
- Children: Charles Colcock Jones, Jr. Joseph Jones
- Parents: John Jones Jr. (father); Mary Sharpe (mother)
- Relatives: John Jones Sr. (grandfather)

Charles Colcock Jones Sr. (December 20, 1804 – March 16, 1863) was an American Presbyterian clergyman, educator, and planter of Liberty County, Georgia. He was both a slave owner and a fervent missionary to slaves.

== Early life ==
The son of John Jones Jr., a merchant and planter with deep roots in coastal Georgia, Charles Colcock Jones Sr. was born on December 20, 1804, at Liberty Hall, his father's plantation in Liberty County. He made a profession of faith when he was 17 and was then prepared for the Presbyterian ministry at Phillips Academy (1825–27), Andover Theological Seminary (1827–29), and Princeton Theological Seminary (1829–30). In 1846, Jones received an honorary doctor of divinity degree from Jefferson College, Canonsburg, Pennsylvania.

His paternal grandfather was major John Jones Sr., who was killed in the siege of Savannah twenty-five years before Charles's birth.

== Career ==
While in the North, Jones agonized over the morality of owning slaves, but he returned to Liberty County to become a planter, a fervent missionary to the slaves, sometimes called the "Apostle to Slaves," and a somewhat reluctant defender of the institution of slavery. In 1830, he married his first cousin, Mary Jones; they had four children, three of whom survived to maturity.

He served as pastor of the First Presbyterian Church of Savannah, Georgia (1831–32), Professor of church history and polity at Columbia Theological Seminary, Columbia, South Carolina, (1835–38), returned to missionary work in 1839, and was again Professor at Columbia Theological Seminary (1847–50). He then moved to Philadelphia and served as corresponding secretary of the Board of Domestic Missions of the Presbyterian Church until 1853, when his health failed and he returned again to Liberty County.

He spent the remainder of his life supervising his three plantations, Arcadia, Montevideo, and Maybank, while continuing his evangelization of slaves. Besides many tracts and papers, Jones published several books including The Religious Instruction of the Negroes in the United States (1842), an appeal to slave owners and ministers to provide religious instruction to slaves. Jones's Catechism of Scripture Doctrine and Practice (1837) was translated into Armenian and Chinese, and he also wrote History of the Church of God (1867). His brother-in-law wrote that Jones "did more than any other man in arousing the whole church of this country to a new interest in the spiritual welfare of the Africans in our midst."

Two of Jones's children became notable in their own right: Charles C. Jones Jr. (1831–1893), a Georgia lawyer, historian, and amateur archaeologist; and Joseph Jones (1833–1896), a Louisiana physician and medical school professor.

== Legacy ==
- In 1972, literary critic Robert Manson Myers published a huge collection of Jones family letters in The Children of Pride. A work of more than 1,800 pages, the book won a National Book Award (1973).
- In 2005, historian Erskine Clarke published Dwelling Place: A Plantation Epic; based on an even larger collection of Jones family correspondence, it won a Bancroft Prize (2006).
