= Charles C. Jones Jr. =

American writer (1831–1893)

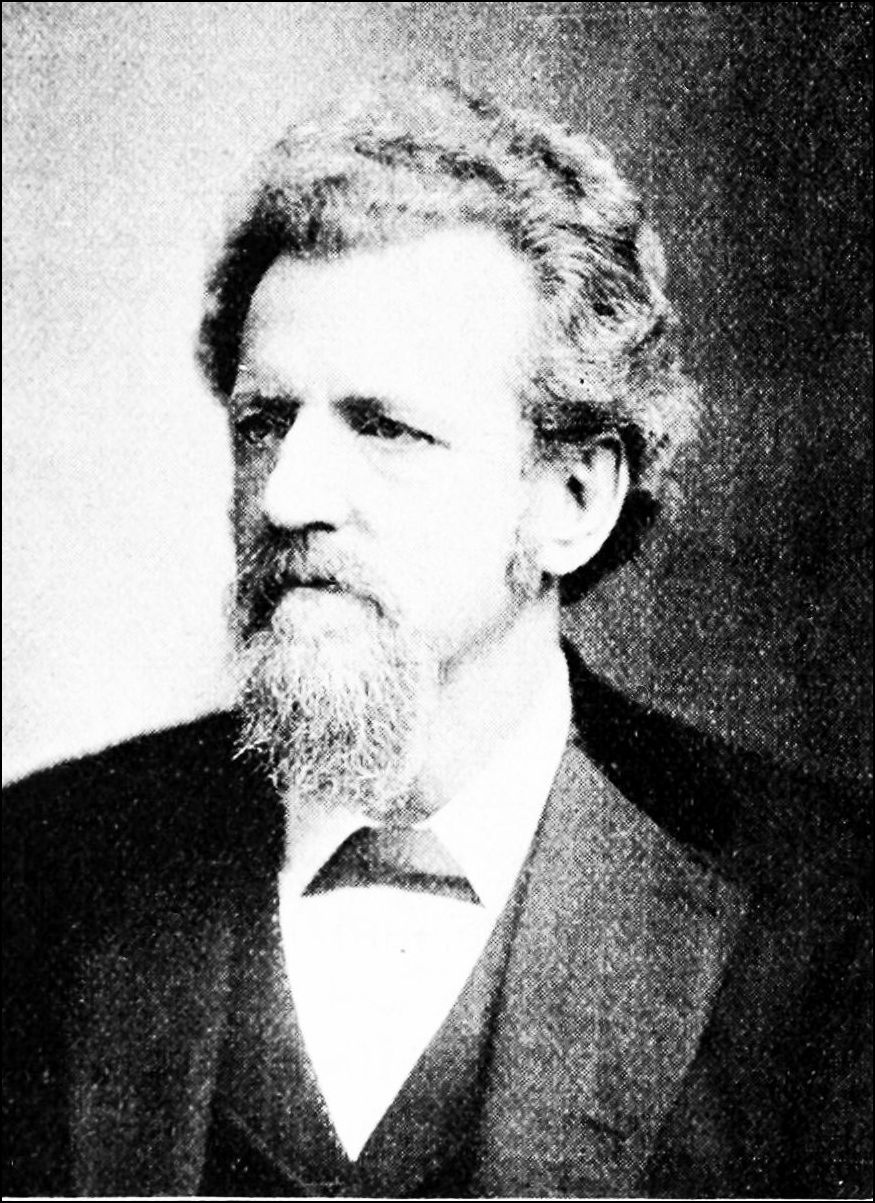
- Jones in 1893
- Born: Charles Colcock Jones Jr. October 28, 1831; Savannah, Georgia, U.S.
- Died: July 19, 1893 (aged 61); Summerville, Georgia, U.S.
- Occupations: Author; lawyer; politician
- Writing career
- Years active: 1861–1888
- Genres: Non-fiction

Charles Colcock Jones Jr. (October 28, 1831 – July 19, 1893) was an American author, lawyer, and politician who served as the 35th mayor of Savannah, Georgia, from 1860 to 1861.

== Biography ==
Jones was born in 1831 to Charles C. Jones., a Presbyterian minister. He graduated with a bachelor's degree from Princeton University in 1852 and a law degree from Harvard University in 1855. He became mayor of Savannah, Georgia in 1860. Because of the American Civil War, he nearly lost his fortune and had to move to New York City, where he practiced law and managed the family plantation from afar. In 1877 he moved relocated to Augusta, Georgia. Jones died of Bright's disease in 1893, aged 61. He is interred in Summerville Cemetery in Augusta.

Jones married twice: first to Ruth Berrien Whitehead, then to Ruth's cousin once removed, Eva Berrien Eve (who had been a bridesmaid at their wedding). His son, Edgeworth Casey Jones (1867–1931), became a prominent memorialist, having changed his name to Charles Edgeworth Jones. He was elected a member of the American Antiquarian Society in 1869 and to the American Philosophical Society in 1881.

== Selected works ==
- Monumental Remains of Georgia (1861)
- Historical Sketch of the Chatham Artillery (1867)
- Antiquities of the Southern Indians, particularly of the Georgia tribes (1873, 1878)
- The Siege of Savannah in December, 1864 (1874)
- The Dead Towns of Georgia (1878)
- History of Georgia (1883)
- Negro Myths of the Georgia Coast (1888)

== See also ==
- List of mayors of Savannah, Georgia
