= Charles Pickman Jones =

English-Spanish entrepreneur

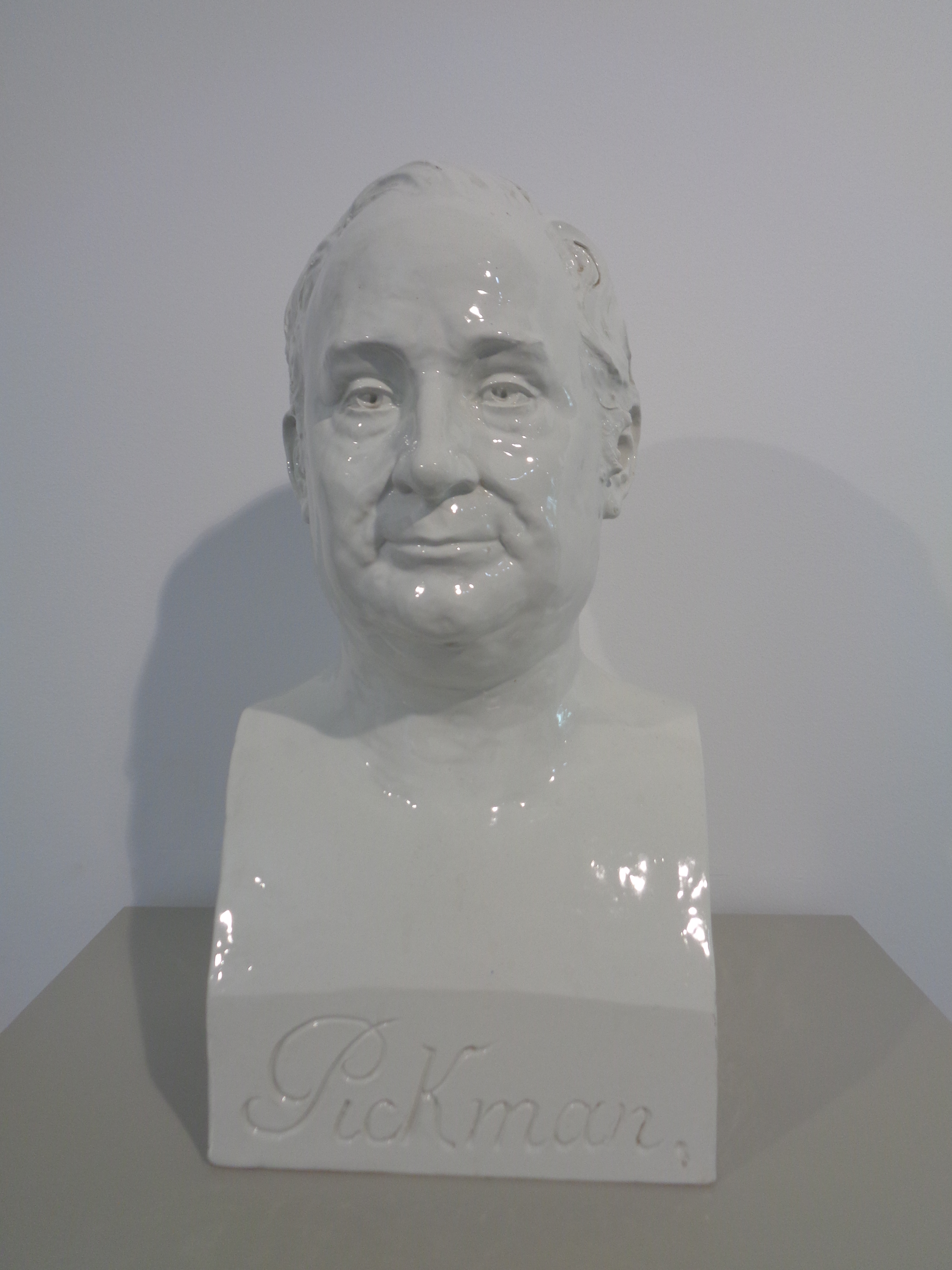
- Ceramic bust of Carlos Pickman by Antonio Susillo in 1885, Ceramic Centre Triana, Seville
- Born: 4 March 1808; London, England
- Died: 4 June 1883 (aged 75); Seville, Spain
- Title: First Marquess of Pickman
- Spouse: María Josefa Pickman y Martínez de la Vega
- Children: 2

Charles Pickman Jones, 1st Marquess of Pickman (Hispanicized as Carlos Pickman; 4 March 1808 – 4 June 1883) was an English-Spanish entrepreneur. He founded a ceramics factory in the old Monastery of the Cartuja (Charterhouse) in Seville.

== Biography ==
He was the son of a respected English merchant, Richard Pickman. Richard was born in Wallingford in 1763 and died in 1838 in Liverpool. He traded glassware and ceramics from Staffordshire, the seat of England's pottery industry, and had commercial headquarters in the port cities of London and Liverpool. He married Susannah Jones, who was from Farmborg Hall, London.

His son, William Pickman Hicks, moved to Cádiz in 1810 to trade with these products in the city but died in 1822 without having much success. In 1822 William's half-brother, Charles Pickman, moved to Seville to continue with the business. He partnered with the widow of William and opened his shop in "calle Gallegos". Charles married William's daughter, Maria Josefa Pickman y Martinez de la Vega. He started a project in 1837 with his brother-in-law, Guillermo Aponte y Martinez de la Vega, to found a ceramics factory.

After the ecclesiastical confiscations of Mendizabal, he leased the Carthusian Monastery of Santa Maria de las Cuevas (which was empty) with the intention of starting his ceramics manufacturing business just as his father had done in England. The brand of ceramics Pickman took its name from Charles's last name and the name of the monastery: la Cartuja de Sevilla-Pickman.

The business flourished, and the ceramics factory became one of the most well known in Europe. He also managed to trade with countries in Latin America.

Thanks to his social and commercial relations, he came to be elected Royal Commissioner of Agriculture, Industry, and Commerce in the province of Seville and Vice President of the National Agricultural Academy, Manufacturing, and Commerce of Paris.

In 1871, King Amadeo I of Spain chose Pickman's factory as the supplier to the Royal House. In February 1873, during the reign of that monarch, he received the noble title of Marquess of Pickman for his entrepreneurial activity.
