= Robert Carter (editor) =

American editor, historian and author (1819–1879)

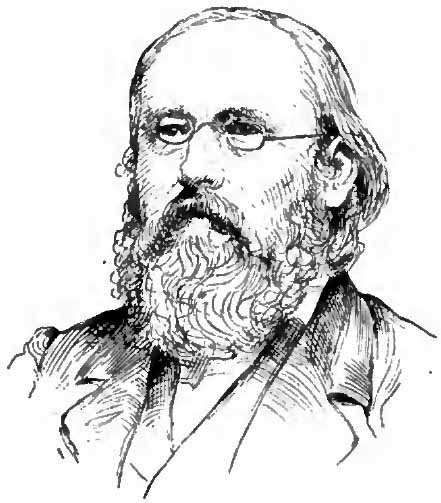
- Born: February 5, 1819; Albany
- Died: February 15, 1879; Cambridge
- Occupations: Editor, writer

Robert Carter (February 5, 1819 Albany, New York – February 15, 1879 Cambridge, Massachusetts) was an American editor, historian and writer. He was involved in the formation of the Republican Party.

== Biography ==
=== Education ===
He received a common school education, and passed one term in the Jesuit college of Chambly, Quebec. At 15, he was appointed assistant to the state librarian, who was also his guardian, at the state library at Albany. He remained there until 1838. At this time he began to publish poems and sketches in the daily papers, his first contribution being a long poem, which he dropped stealthily into the editor's letterbox, and which appeared the next day with flattering comments, but so frightfully misprinted that he hardly knew it. This experience and a natural aptitude led him to acquire proofreading as an accomplishment, at which he became very expert.

=== The Pioneer ===
In 1841 he went to Boston, where he formed a lifelong friendship with James Russell Lowell, and together they began The Pioneer, a Literary and Critical Magazine, a monthly magazine which the Cyclopædia of American Literature said was "of too fine a cast to be successful." Nevertheless, its want of success was due, not to the editors, but to the publisher, who mismanaged it and failed when but three numbers had been issued. Among the contributors were Poe, Hawthorne, Whittier, Neal, Barrett (afterward Mrs. Browning), and the sculptor Story. Carter began in its pages a serial novel entitled The Armenian's Daughter.

=== William H. Prescott ===
He next spent two years in editing statistical and geographical works, and writing for periodicals. His story, "The Great Tower of Tarudant," ran through several numbers of the Broadway Journal, then edited by Poe. In 1845 he became a clerk in the post office at Cambridge, and from 1847 to 1848 was private secretary to Prescott the historian. His elaborate article on the character and habits of Prescott, written for the New York Tribune just after the historian's death in 1859, was republished in a memorial volume issued by the Massachusetts Historical Society.

=== Early politics ===
Carter joined the Free Soil Party in 1848, and in 1850 wrote for the Boston Atlas a series of articles in reply to Francis Bowen's attack on the Hungarian revolutionists. These articles were republished in a pamphlet as The Hungarian Controversy (Boston, 1852). They are said to have caused the rejection of Bowen's nomination as professor of history at Harvard. At the same time Carter edited, with Kossuth's approval, a large volume entitled Kossuth in New England (Boston, 1852).

From 1851 to 1852 he edited, at first as assistant of John G. Palfrey and afterward alone, the Boston Commonwealth, the chief exponent of the free soilers. For two years he was secretary of the state committee of the Free Soil Party.

=== Republican Party foundation ===
In the summer of 1854, he obtained the consent of the committee to call a convention, which he did without assistance, sending out thousands of circulars to men whose names were on the committee's books. The convention met in Worcester, July 20, was so large that no hall could contain it, and held its session in the open air. A short platform drawn up by him was adopted, together with the name "Republican," and on his motion a committee of six was appointed to organize the new party, John A. Andrew being made its chairman.

=== More editing ===
In 1855 Carter edited the Boston Telegraph, in conjunction with W. S. Robinson and Hildreth the historian; in 1856 he edited the Atlas; and from 1857 to 1859 he was Washington correspondent of the New York Tribune. His next work was with George Ripley and Charles A. Dana on the first edition of the American Cyclopædia (1859 to 1863), in which many important articles were from his pen, including "Egypt," "Hindostan," "Mormons," and the history of the United States. In January 1864, he was appointed private secretary of the treasury agent whose headquarters were at Beaufort, South Carolina; and from July of that year until October 1869, he edited the Rochester, New York, Democrat, doing such work for it as was seldom done on any but metropolitan journals.

When news came of the assassination of President Lincoln, he wrote, without consulting any book or memoranda, an article giving a brief but circumstantial account, with dates, of every celebrated case of regicide. He was editor of Appletons' Journal from 1870 to 1873. And then he became associate editor for the revision of the American Cyclopædia, writing articles on "Jefferson Davis" and "The Confederate States of American". In 1874 impaired health compelled him to discontinue his literary work, and in the next three years he made three tours in Europe.

=== Family ===
His first wife, Ann Augusta Gray, was a successful writer of poems and tales for the young. They married in 1846, and she died in 1863. He married his second wife, Susan Nichols, in 1864. She was principal of the women's art school at Cooper Union in New York City, published handbooks of art and contributed to periodicals.

== Works ==
He was the author of A Summer Cruise on the Coast of New England (Boston, 1864), which passed through several editions. The 1888 edition has an introduction by Rossiter Johnson with biographical notes. He left unpublished memoirs, of which only the first volume was complete in manuscript.
