= Andrew McClary =

Irish-American military officer and Patriot (1730-1775)

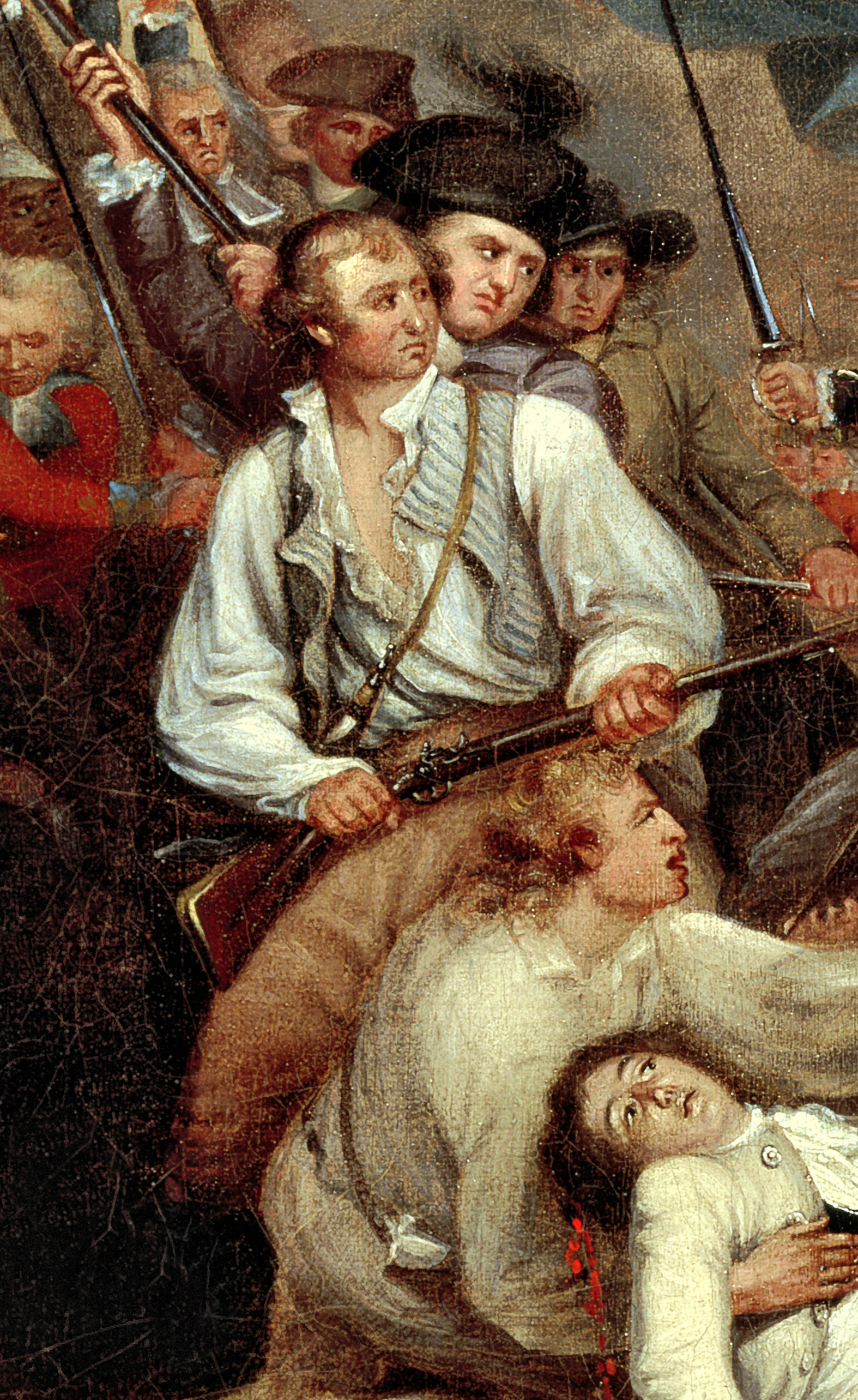
- Detail of McClary and Knowlton from Trumbull painting. McClary is standing behind Thomas Knowlton, holding musket. Major McClary was the last American soldier to fall during the Battle of Bunker Hill.
- Born: 1730; Ulster, Ireland
- Died: June 17, 1775 (aged 44–45) Charlestown, Massachusetts
- Buried: Medford, Massachusetts
- Allegiance: United Colonies
- Branch: Rogers' Rangers; Continental Army
- Rank: Major
- Conflicts: American Revolutionary War: Battle of Bunker Hill †

Andrew McClary (1730 – June 17, 1775) (Note: Exact date of birth unavailable.) was an Irish soldier and major in the Continental Army during the American Revolution. McClary was born in Ulster, Ireland and came to colonial America with his parents at age sixteen where they lived on a farm in New Hampshire. Here the McClary family built a local tavern, where town meetings were also held. Many of New Hampshire's prominent and influential men had come from the McClary family. In session Andrew McClary had also become the Town Clerk and soon a notable community leader during the years before the revolution. In the mid 1700s New Hampshire frontier McClary gained much of his field experience leading expeditions against hostile Indians in the area.

Just before the revolution McClary planned and led an attack on a British supply depot at the castle at Portsmouth. McClary was said to have been a natural leader and one who greatly inspired morale among the New Hampshire militia. During the revolution he assembled a company of men in New Hampshire and marched over seventy miles to Boston and fought at the Battle of Bunker Hill. During the retreat he was the last soldier to leave the battle site. McClary was killed not long after the retreat, when he returned to the site to monitor British activity, the last American soldier to die during the battle.

== Early life and career ==
Coat of Arms of Andrew McClary

Andrew McClary was the second son of his father, Andrew Senior, who emigrated from Ulster with his wife and children to British North America in 1726. In 1733 his family moved to Londonderry, New Hampshire, where they lived until 1738 and then moved to Epsom, New Hampshire, where the elder McClary soon died. McClary stood well over six feet tall, with a straight, proportioned and athletic build, with blue eyes and was known as a jovial and generous man. The McClary family were among the most prominent and respected families in the Suncook Valley region.

McClary and his older brother John McClary were the leading influential men in all the town and military affairs. John became a colonel just before the American Revolution began. His nephew Michael would later become General Michael McClary. McClary served as the town clerk. His entries in the town books revealed a thorough knowledge of business and language and according to contemporary historian John C. French, exhibited a unique literary and writing style. His last entry in the town's records were made approximately one year before he died.

McClary married Elizabeth McCrillis, their marriage producing five sons (James, Harvey, Andrew, John, and William) and three daughters (Elizabeth, Margaret, and Nancy.) Born in Ireland in 1730, (when it was the Kingdom of Ireland), McClary received his basic education there before coming to the colonies in America with his parents. McClary helped his father build a tavern on their farm in Epsom, which the younger McClary managed on a regular basis. After the death of his father in 1765 he became the proprietor of the farm and its tavern. With no meetinghouse in Epsom before 1794, all the town meetings were held at McClary’s Farm Tavern, which was also used for various social gatherings.

In 1755 McClary led a company of soldiers in search of the Indians who massacred and took prisoners from the McCall family of Salisbury. During the French and Indian War the colonials of the New England frontier lived in constant fear of Indian attacks. McClary spent much of his time scouting the area, along with hunting and clearing of the land. He also became a local champion in the sport of boxing and wrestling. Along with Robert Rogers, McClary was also close friends with noted Revolutionary War figures like, John Goffe and John Stark, often meeting with them at the McClary farm tavern with increasing frequency where matters of the Revolution were now being openly discussed.

== Military life ==
As an experienced scout in New Hampshire McClary was soon promoted an officer at an early age in Robert Rogers' famous company of Rogers' Rangers, and finally, as he gained experience, was chosen to be the leader in all local engagements against the local Indians.

In the months preceding the Revolutionary War it is said that McClary began to distinguish himself for his resolution and patriotism in planning and leading the attack of the castle at Portsmouth, New Hampshire, on December 1, 1774. For what was considered his heroic efforts, McClary had won for himself a prominent standing among the New Hampshire Militia.

=== Battle of Bunker Hill ===
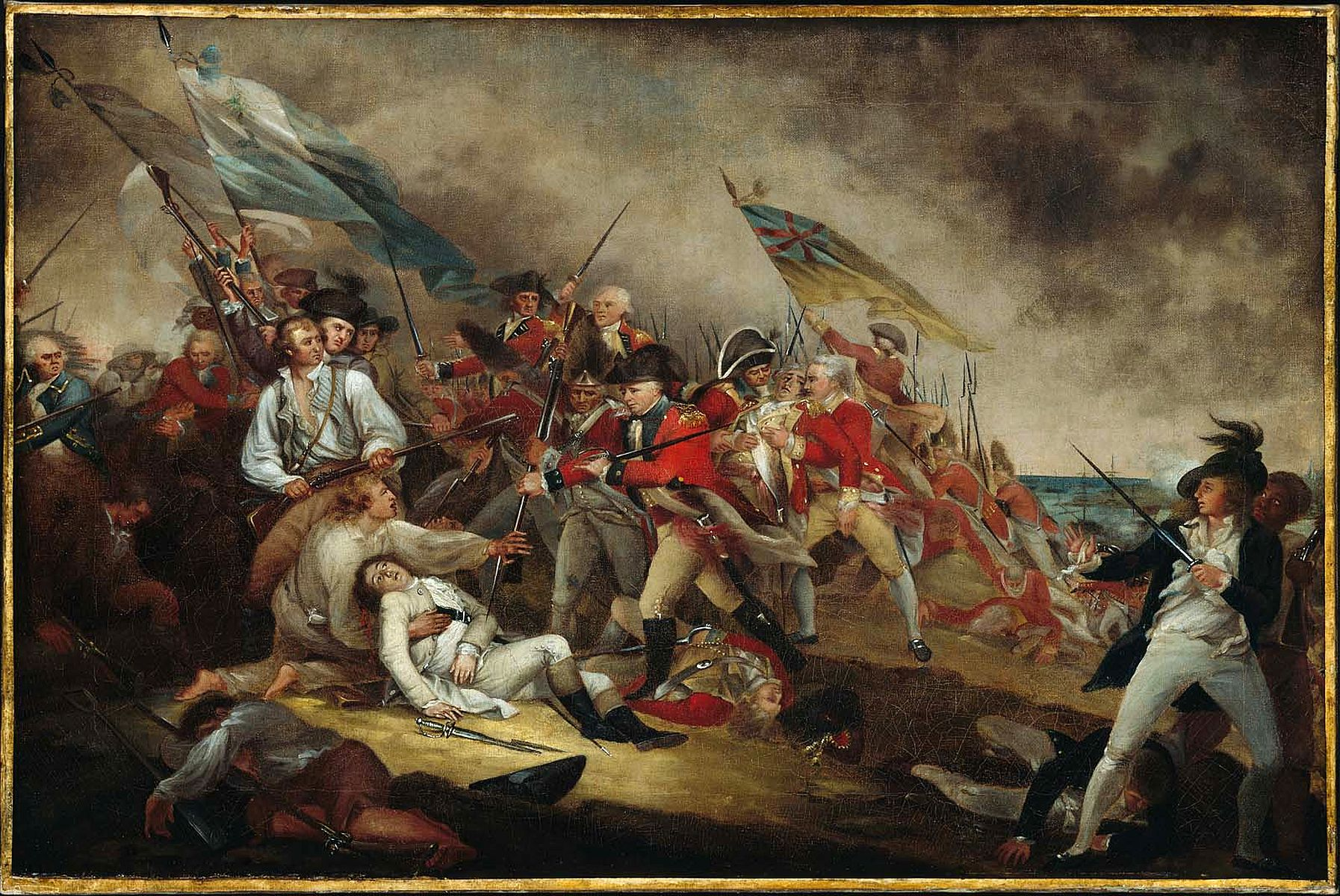
The Death of General Warren by John Trumbull McClary (center left) is depicted in Trumbull's famous painting, wearing a white shirt with musket in hand and standing behind the mortally wounded Dr. Warren.

On April 27, 1775, when word of the Battles at Lexington and Concord reached the Suncook Valley in New Hampshire, McClary was busy plowing land back on his farm. He and other patriots gathered and "flew to arms" and assembled at Nottingham Square. There they made Captain McClary commander of the company consisting of eighty men. They departed from Nottingham Square at one o'clock in the afternoon and conducted a "rapid march" south to Kingston. From there they continued at a fast pace without resting until sunset, arriving at Haverhill, just over the Massachusetts border on the Merrimack River. McClary's company covered twenty-seven miles in six hours. They continued for a few more miles then stopped and took supper at Andover. After resting a bit they resumed marching through the night and by sunrise had covered seventy miles distance. After passing through Medford, they continued south and marched on Cambridge Common where upon arrival were all willing and eager to fight for the Revolution. There McClary and his company joined up with Colonel John Stark, who gave McClary the rank of major. On June 16 they received orders to join with American forces and prepare for battle at Bunker Hill, in Charlestown, across the Mystic River from Boston. The battle was to take place on the Charleston Peninsula which was only accessible to American infantry by crossing over the very narrow Charleston Neck.

During the first British advance on the American fortifications atop Breed's Hill, McClary, along with Seth Pomeroy, John Stark, James Reed and Thomas Knowlton, were at the front in the redoubt. According to Colonel Swett in his 1826 account of the battle, when the Americans were finally given the order to fire, McClary, with his stentorian voice, was distinctly heard over the roar of cannon and musket fire, "animating and encouraging the men as though he would inspire every ball that sped, with his own fire and energy."

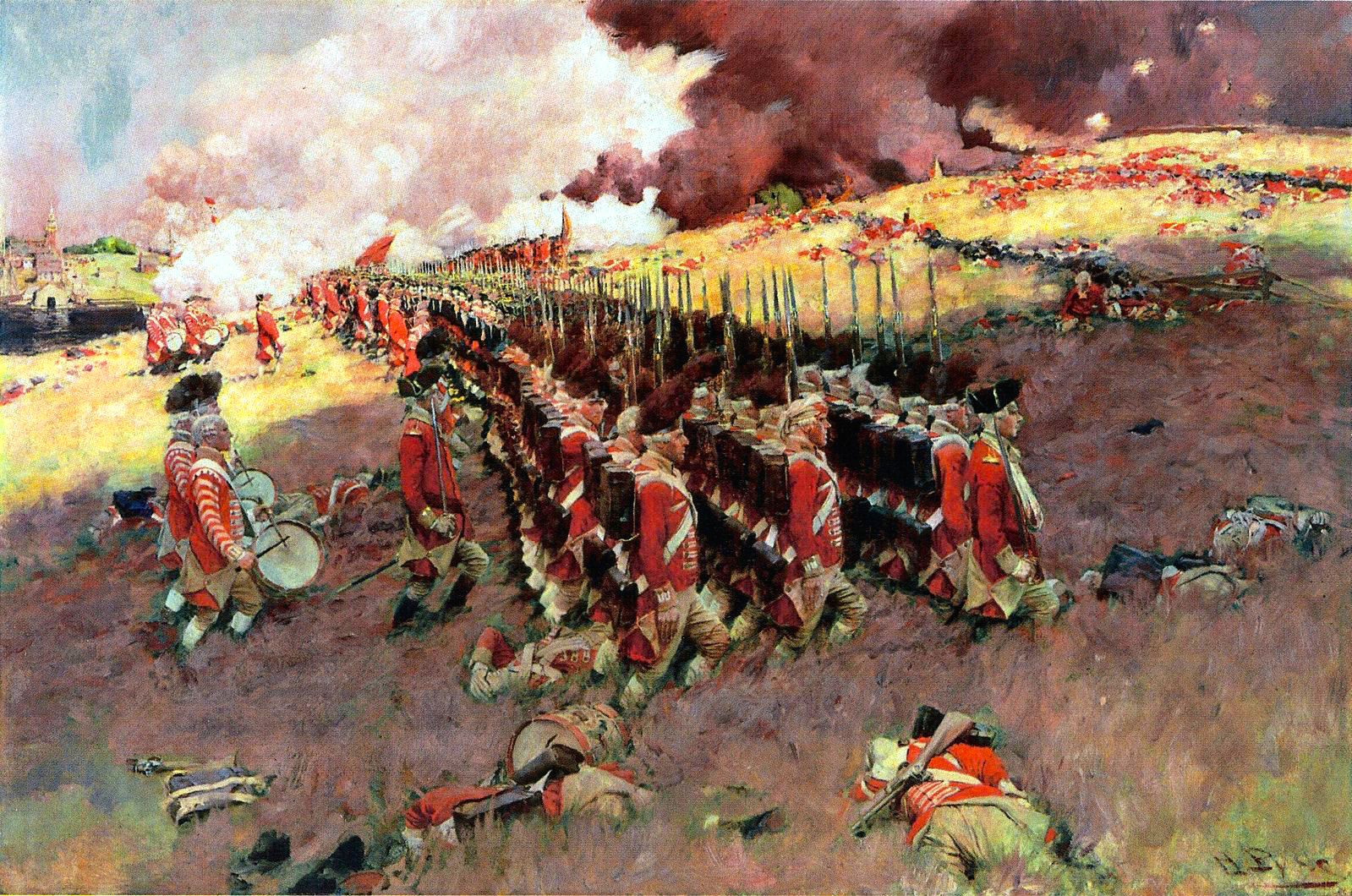
The Battle of Bunker Hill by Howard Pyle, 1897

As the battle unfolded the American soldiers were directed to spot and fire upon every British officer they could distinguish. When Major McClary would sight an officer he would instantly call out: "There, See that officer. Let’s shoot at him!" Two or three soldiers, all excellent marksmen, would then fire at the same time, making sure their target was hit. During the battle, though a British tactical victory, the British lost a considerable number of officers.

After the battle, with many wounded in the retreat, McClary immediately procured a horse and rode five miles north to Medford and returned with bandages and other supplies for the wounded. He then prepared to go back across Charlestown Neck to observe any further British movement at Bunker Hill. He was cautioned by his son and other men not to embark on such a risky effort, but McClary exclaimed, "The ball is not yet cast that will kill me!". Upon returning while crossing the Neck to rejoin his men, a shot from a frigate (Note: Other sources claim the shot came from a floating battery, as Charlestown Neck was under artillery fire from several directions.) passed through McClary's body. He leaped a few feet from the ground, keeled over and fell dead, face down. Later McClary would be carried to Medford, and interred with military honors.

Henry Dearborn in his 1818 account of the battle wrote of McClary:

"There was no cavalry in either army. From the ships of war and a large battery on Copp's Hill, a heavy cannonade was kept up upon our line and redoubt...during the retreat; but with very little effect, except that of killing the brave Major Andrew M'Clary of Col. Stark's regiment soon after we retired from Bunker Hill. He was among the first officers of the army. —Possessing a sound judgment, of undaunted bravery, enterprising, ardent and zealous, both as a patriot and soldier. His loss was severely felt by his compatriots in arms..."

McClary was technically the highest-ranking American officer to die in the battle; General Warren had declined an offer of command and had no commission at the time of battle. McClary's death was the last to occur there. He was one among the ten American officers to perish during the battle.

McClary's body was taken to Medford, Massachusetts, just outside Boston near the encampment of the New Hampshire Brigade, along with other soldiers who died during the battle, and was buried with military honors.

== Legacy ==
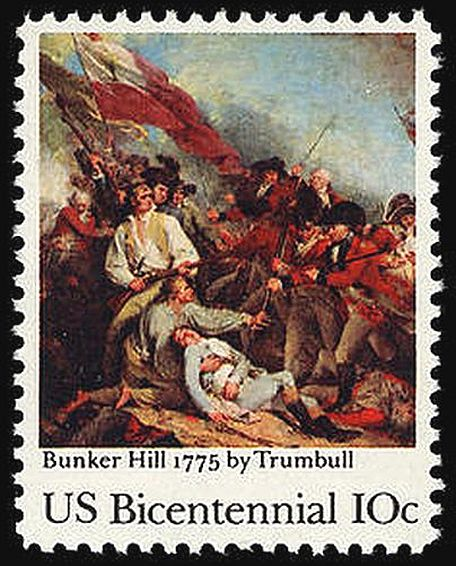
McClary standing behind Thomas Knowlton, holding musket wearing) white shirt, along with the mortally wounded Warren are among the central figures depicted on a U.S. commemorative postage stamp, issued on the bicentennial anniversary of the Battle of Bunker Hill in 1975

A eulogy to McClary appeared in The New Hampshire Gazette, dated Epsom, July 1775. It read: "The Major discovered great intrepidity and presence of mind in the action, and his noble soul glowed with ardor and the love of his country. . . ."

On June 17, 1843, the 68th anniversary of the Battle of Bunker Hill, Andrew McClary's name was spoken in the closing words in the dedication to the Monument at Bunker Hill. In honor of McClary, a bronze memorial tablet was unveiled at Epsom on August 25, 1905, with appropriate honors. The tablet was secured through the efforts of the Epsom Historical Club, and is attached to a tall granite pillar, weighing approximately 5,000 pounds (2,300 kg).

McClary's image appears in John Trumbull's famous painting of the Battle of Bunker Hill, where he is pictured raising his musket to shoot the British soldier attempting to bayonet the mortally wounded Warren.

Fort McClary in Maine at Kittery Point was renamed in Andrew McClary's honor, the fort officially established in 1808.

The schooner USS McClary was named after McClary. On September 2, 1776, the vessel was commissioned by the state of New Hampshire and was armed with eight cannons and six swivel guns. The vessel made five voyages between September 1776 and February 1778.

McClary is featured on a New Hampshire historical marker (number 199) along U.S. Route 4 in Epsom.

== Description ==
Written by Warren Trip in "The McClary's of Epsom" is the following text:

"He was a favorite officer, nearly six and one-half feet in height, with a Herculean form, a voice like Stentor and strength of Ajax, never equaled in athletic exercises and unsubdued in single combat. Whole bodies of men had been overcome by him, and he seemed totally unconscious that he was not equally unconquerable at the cannon’s mouth."

== See also ==
- List of American Revolutionary War battles
- List of Continental Army units
- List of British Forces in the American Revolutionary War
- Dearborn-Putnam controversy

== Bibliography ==
- Bardwell, John D (2005). Old Kittery. Arcadia Publishing. ISBN 9780738524764.,
- Brown, George Waldo; French, John C. (1910). Manchester Historic Association collections. Manchester Historic Association.,
- Carleton, Hiram (2003). Genealogical and Family History of the State of Vermont. Genealogical Publishing Com. ISBN 9780806347943.,
- Chidsey, Donald B. (1966). Siege of Boston. Crown Publishers, Inc., New York., – Cited page
- Dearborn, Henry; Putnam, Daniel (1818). An Account of the Battle of Bunker Hill. Munroe & Francis, Boston.,
- Ellis, George E. (2008). Battle of Bunker Hill. Lee and Shepard Publishers, Boston. ISBN 9781582184029.
- Frothingham, Richard; Swett, Samuel (1850). The Command in the Battle of Bunker Hill. Charles C. Little & James brown, Boston.,
- Frothingham, Richard (1890). Battle OF Bunker Hill. Little, Brown & Company, Boston.,
- Heath, William (1901). Memoirs of Major General William Heath. W. Abbatt.,
- Ketchum, Richard M. (1974). Decisive Day, The Battle of Bunker Hill. Doubleday & Company, Inc., New York. ISBN 9781466879508.,
- Stearns, Ezra S.; Whitcher, William Frederick; Parker, Edward Everett (1908). Genealogical and Family History of the State of New Hampshire: A Record of the Achievements of Her People in the Making of a Commonwealth and the Founding of a Nation, Volume 2. Lewis Publishing Company., (pages 465–992 of 2067 pages), McClary entry
- Swett, Samuel (1826). History of Bunker Hill battle: With a plan. Munroe and Francis.,

Web site sources

- "The Battle of Bunker's Hill, June 17th 1775". Library of Congress.
- Knowles, Gilbert H. (1971). "The McClary Family of Epsom" (PDF). Epsom Historical Association.
- McClarey, Donald R. "John Trumbull and Bunker Hill". Almost Chosen People.
- "Major Andrew McClary". Ancestry.com.
- "The Battle of Bunker Hill". Ancestry.com.
- "Epson Revolutionary War Soldier, Andrew McClary". Epsom Historical Association.

Further reading

- Fleming, Thomas (2015). Bunker Hill. New Word City, Inc. ISBN 9781612309279., 555 pages
- Philbrick, Nathaniel (2013). Bunker Hill: A City, A Siege, A Revolution. Penguin. ISBN 9781101622704., 416 pages
