= Dearborn–Putnam controversy =

1818 publishing controversy in the United States

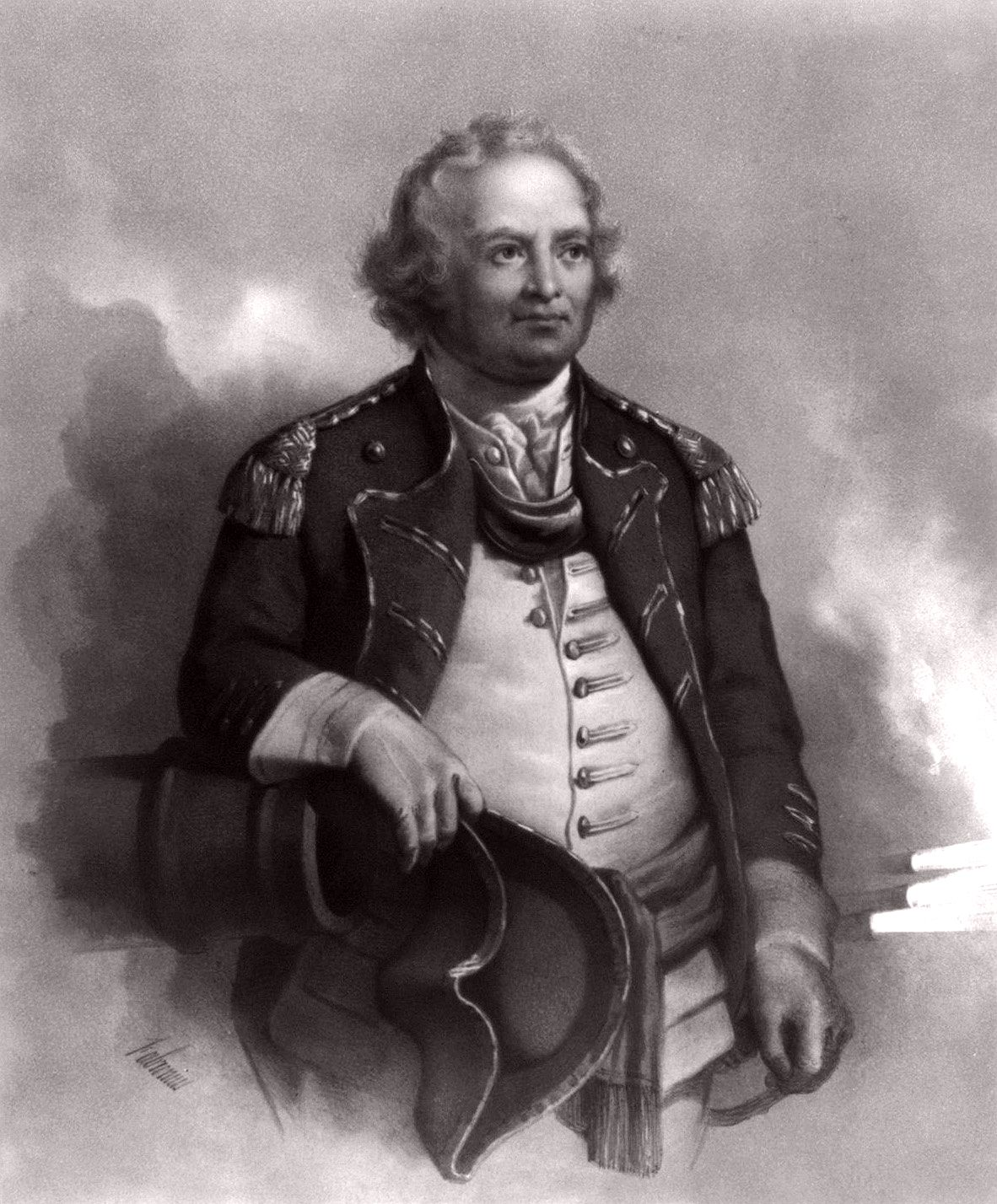
Israel Putnam

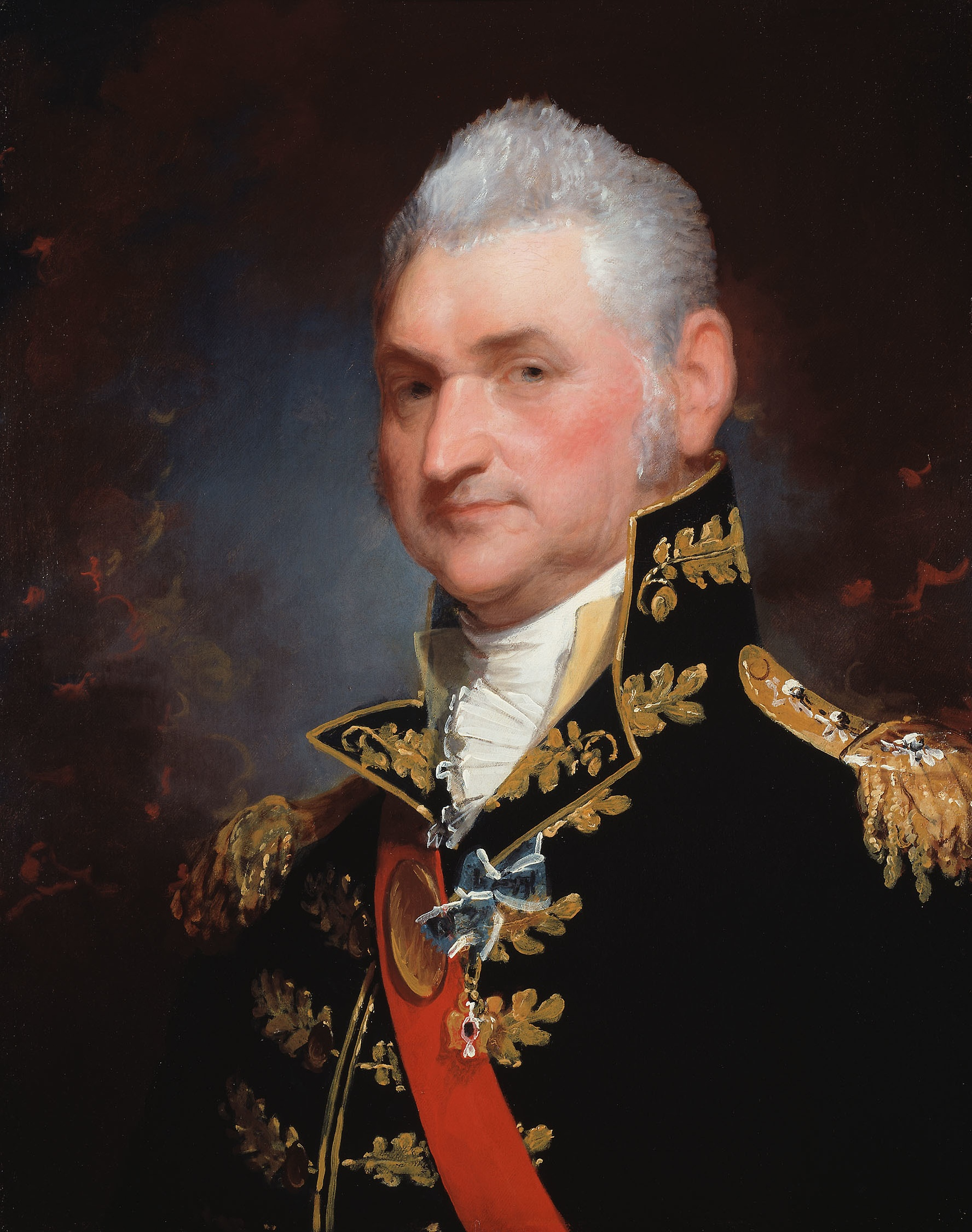
Henry Dearborn

Putnam and Dearborn were both present at the Battle of Bunker Hill.

The Dearborn–Putnam controversy erupted in 1818 when Henry Dearborn published a post-war account of General Israel Putnam's performance during the Battle of Bunker Hill in 1775. Both Putnam and the much younger Dearborn were present before and during the battle, with Dearborn at the front lines while Putnam was about the battle scene directing troops and overseeing the construction of fortifications before the fighting began. Accounts of Putnam's presence during the battle, however, have varied among veteran officers of the battle and some historians. During the battle, there was a fair amount of disorganization among the hastily assembled Continental Army (Note: The Continental Army was established June 14th, just three days before the Battle of Bunker Hill.) and militia, making it difficult for any one participant to give an overall assessment of everyone's performance.

The actual controversy was sparked 43 years after the battle, when Dearborn published his account of the battle in a widely read political magazine accusing the deceased Putnam of failing to supply reinforcements, inaction, and cowardice. The sons of both Dearborn and Putnam defended their respective fathers' positions, while various Revolutionary War veterans also lent their support respectively. Along with Dearborn, both Republicans and Federalists, now bitter rivals, saw the controversy as an opportunity to advance their party and win the favor of the general public. Dearborn's efforts, however, were largely not well received and cost him his bid for the governorship of Massachusetts. His accusations resulted in a political and social controversy that was widely covered in the press and in several publications from officers present at the battle. Dearborn's accusations were also addressed by several notable public figures, including Daniel Webster. As such, the controversy remained prominent in the public eye for more than 30 years.

== Putnam and Dearborn at the Battle of Bunker Hill ==
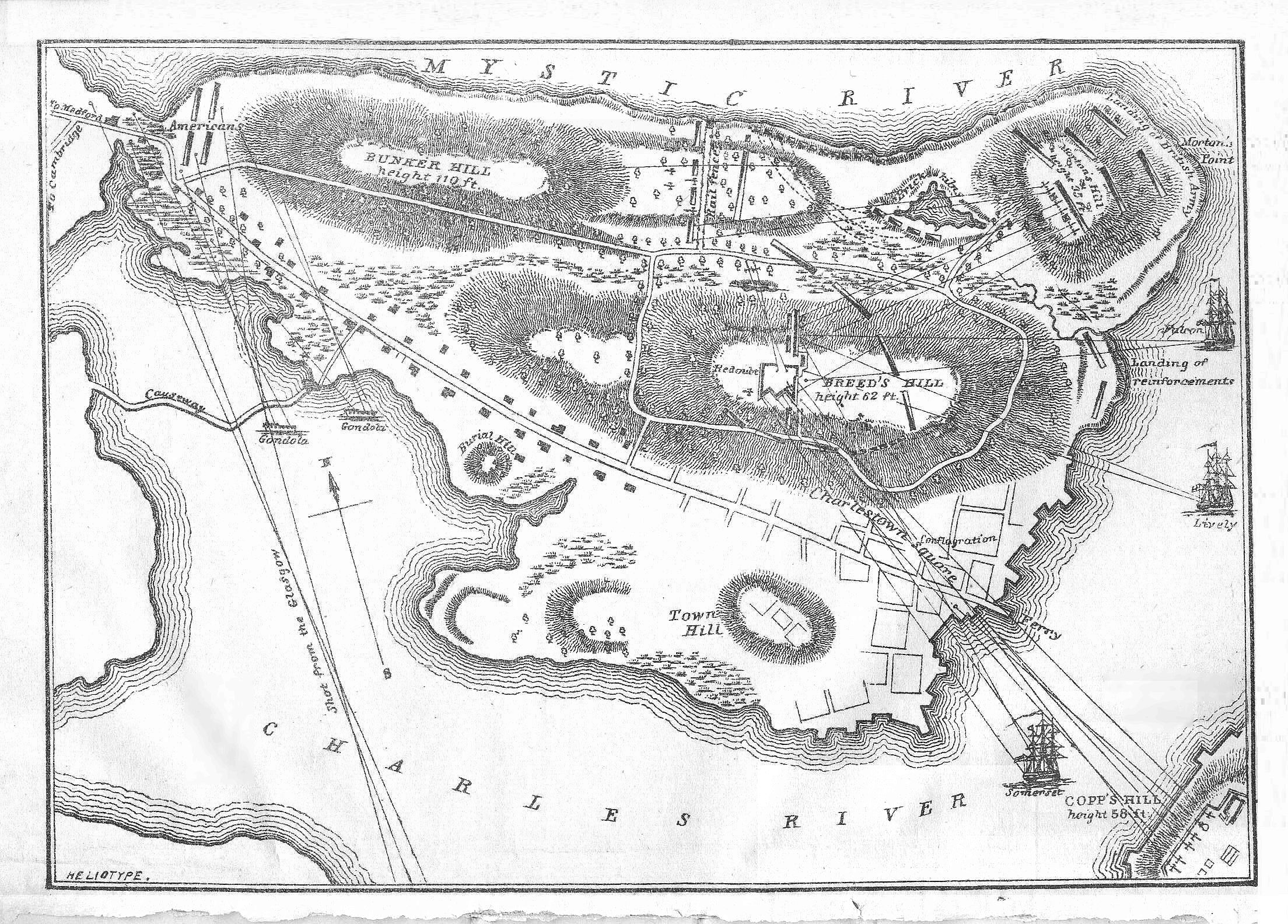
Map of the Battle of Bunker Hill area

The Battle of Bunker Hill occurred on June 17, 1775, in the early stages of the American Revolutionary War, when the American forces as a whole were not yet a fully organized army. After the Siege of Boston, the British needed to secure control of the Charlestown Peninsula overlooking Boston from the north across the Mystic River, giving them command of Boston Harbor and ultimately Boston itself. The Committee of Safety learned a few days in advance that the British were going to try to occupy Dorchester Heights and Charlestown Peninsula. The Patriot forces decided to take the offensive, occupy the peninsula, fortify it, and deny the British the advantage of this important and strategic location. Word of British intentions spread fast among the colonies. General Thomas Gage mistakenly assumed that taking the peninsula from untrained colonial "rebels" would be an easy task.

=== Preparation ===
Dearborn, at age 23, organized and led a local militia troop of 60 men from New Hampshire upon hearing the news of the battles at Lexington and Concord, and joined up with Colonel John Stark's 1st New Hampshire Regiment. They eventually arrived at Charlestown shortly after the British had begun firing their cannon at the American positions. General Putnam, second in command to Colonel William Prescott, (Note: Putnam out-ranked Prescott as a Major General of the Connecticut militia and was his senior by eight years. Prescott, however, was from Massachusetts, and most of the troops were from Massachusetts with a battle to be fought on Massachusetts soil, so Prescott was given command.) and reportedly eager for battle, was already at Cambridge before the battle (Note: Putnam had arrived at Cambridge in the aftermath of the Lexington Concord battles.) with 250 of his men from Connecticut. During this time, Putnam received a private proposal from British Major-General William Howe that, if he would relinquish the rebel forces under his command, Putnam would be made a major general in the British Army and be compensated for his effort. Putnam kept the matter private, but pointedly rejected the offer.

On June 16, Prescott assembled 1,200 men from various regiments and companies, acting on orders from General Artemas Ward, and departed from Cambridge (Note: Headquarters and stores of ammunition were located at Cambridge.) at 9:00 that evening. Putnam had procured the various entrenching tools and materials needed for building the fortifications, had them loaded into wagons, and proceeded to Charlestown with Prescott. There was some disorganization among the colonial troops, some of them with no commanding officers to lead them, along with disagreement among some of the officers as to how and where to prepare for battle. After a two-hour meeting at Charlestown Neck, Putnam and Colonel Richard Gridley, an army engineer, had persuaded Prescott to fortify Breeds Hill rather than Bunker Hill as originally planned.

The American troops crossed Charlestown neck and proceeded up the gentle slopes of Bunker Hill. From there Prescott, for reasons that were never made completely clear, went against orders, assembled a separate party of 1200 men and continued on two hundred yards further down the peninsula to Breed's Hill (Note: The hill at the time was unnamed.) and under cover of darkness began construction of a redoubt and a rail fence that extended to Mystic River, with Gridley in command of construction, while the secondary fortifications were constructed on Bunker Hill. This later proved to be a major tactical error.

With construction of fortifications nearly completed Colonel Prescott offered General Putnam command in the redoubt, but he declined. Instead, Putnam kept busy riding between Bunker and Breed's Hill and about the rail fence acting as a guide and directing troops. Just prior to the battle, General Putnam came back to the redoubt, and urged Prescott that the entrenching tools should be sent back and used to fortify Bunker Hill or they would be extremely difficult to secure or lost during the throes of battle. Prescott was concerned that if he sent men to carry them away they would not return. Putnam assured Prescott that they would all return. A large party was then sent off with the tools, after which Prescott's fears were confirmed—not one of the men returned, including Putnam.

=== Battle ===
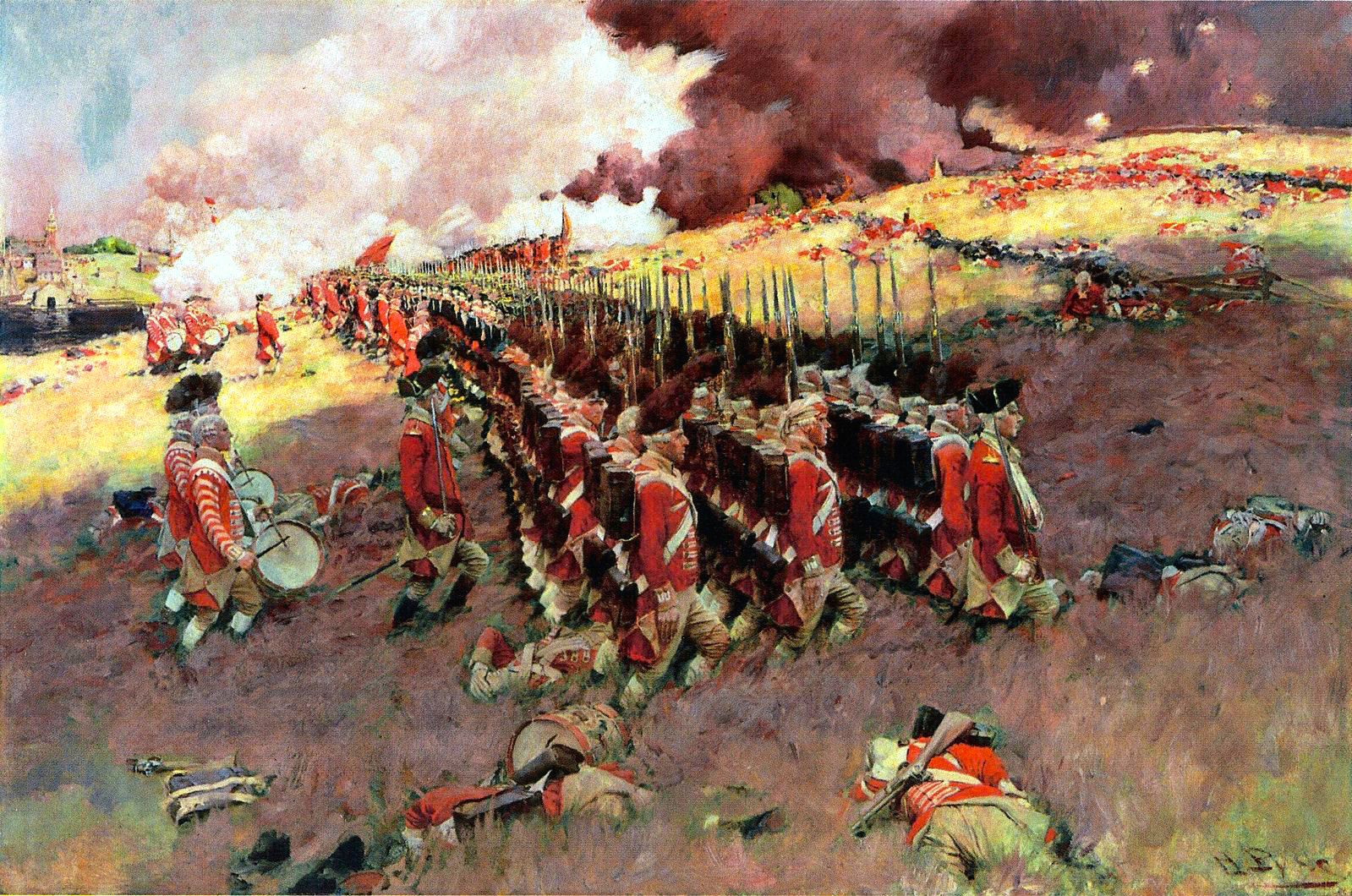
The Battle of Bunker Hill by Howard Pyle, 1897

By daybreak the British became aware of the nearly completed redoubt and opened fire with cannon from ships and the floating batteries that almost surrounded Charlestown Peninsula, and from the battery on Copp's Hill, but with little effect. When it was certain that the British would attack soon, Putnam took flight to Cambridge on horseback to request badly needed supplies and reinforcements from General Ward, but since Charleston Neck was under heavy fire from British ships, and fearing that General Gage might make his principal attack at Cambridge, at this time Ward, not wanting to weaken his troop strength, only released one-third of Stark's regiment for deployment at Charlestown.

At 12:00 on July 17 British troops began crossing the harbor on barges from Boston and landed at Morton's Point on the peninsula, southeast from Breed's Hill. By 2:00 o'clock they had landed between 3000 and 4000 men, under the command of General Howe. Putnam's regiments then began marching for the peninsula across Charlestown neck under heavy cannon fire from British ships, where they arrived, fatigued from marching. At this point Colonel Stark and Captain Dearborn arrived with their troops from New Hampshire and joined in with Prescott's troops, increasing American troop strength to about 1600. Stark's regiment was positioned at the rail fence with Dearborn in his right wing.

The British Regulars made three attempts to take the fortified positions on Breed's Hill. The first two attempts proved to be a dismal failure with many British officers and infantry killed and wounded. Orders were given not to fire upon the advancing British regulars until they were within fifty yards of the rebel fortifications. Some of the rebels made concerted efforts to spot and pick off British officers. Dearborn was positioned on the right at the rail fence, which he claims gave him a fair view of the entire battle. Historian Richard Frothingham and Colonel Samuel Swett claim that General Putnam was at the redoubt during the first attack, but after the failed assault rode to the rear to call for reinforcements. Prescott, realizing ammunition was getting low and needed to be conserved, instructed his men to fire at the advancing British only when they could see the whites of their eyes. (Note: Historians debate as to who exactly spoke these words first; they are attributed to a number of officers, including Putnam.) When ammunition began to run out fire from the colonials almost came to a stop, where the British regulars charged the fortifications, with fixed bayonets. The Americans, very few of them outfitted with bayonets, began a hasty retreat, many of them unable to escape as the British regulars were on them too quickly, and a bloody hand-to-hand combat ensued. The British continued a merciless fire on the retreating colonials. This is when Joseph Warren, shot in the face at close range, was killed. The British had won a tactical victory but had suffered many more casualties than did the American forces.

=== Retreat ===
During the retreat, Dearborn came upon Putnam behind the front lines at Bunker Hill where the latter was still tending to the entrenching tools, one in hand, having them sent from Breed's Hill before the battle had begun. Major Andrew McClary also saw Putnam on Bunker Hill during the retreat with a spade in his hand. Putnam was observed by several men in this capacity, including Major General William Heath, whose account of the battle he published in his memoirs in 1798. There are other historical accounts, however, that claim Putnam was covering the rebels retreating from Breed's Hill while he was at Bunker Hill, urging them to "make a stand here", and renew the fight at the unfinished breastworks.

Dearborn later contended that the battle could have been won if Putnam, who commanded a force approximately equal to that on the front lines, had advanced with his troops. He also maintained that the final advance by the British was with great difficulty and had the American forces at the front lines not run out of ammunition the British would have lost the greater part of their army, compelling them to lay down their arms. After the battle, any chance of reconciliation with the British was now gone as the heavy losses they incurred (Note: British losses were 226 dead, 828 wounded; American losses were 140 killed, 271 wounded and 30 missing.) only strengthened their resolve to crush the rebellion.

== Controversy ==
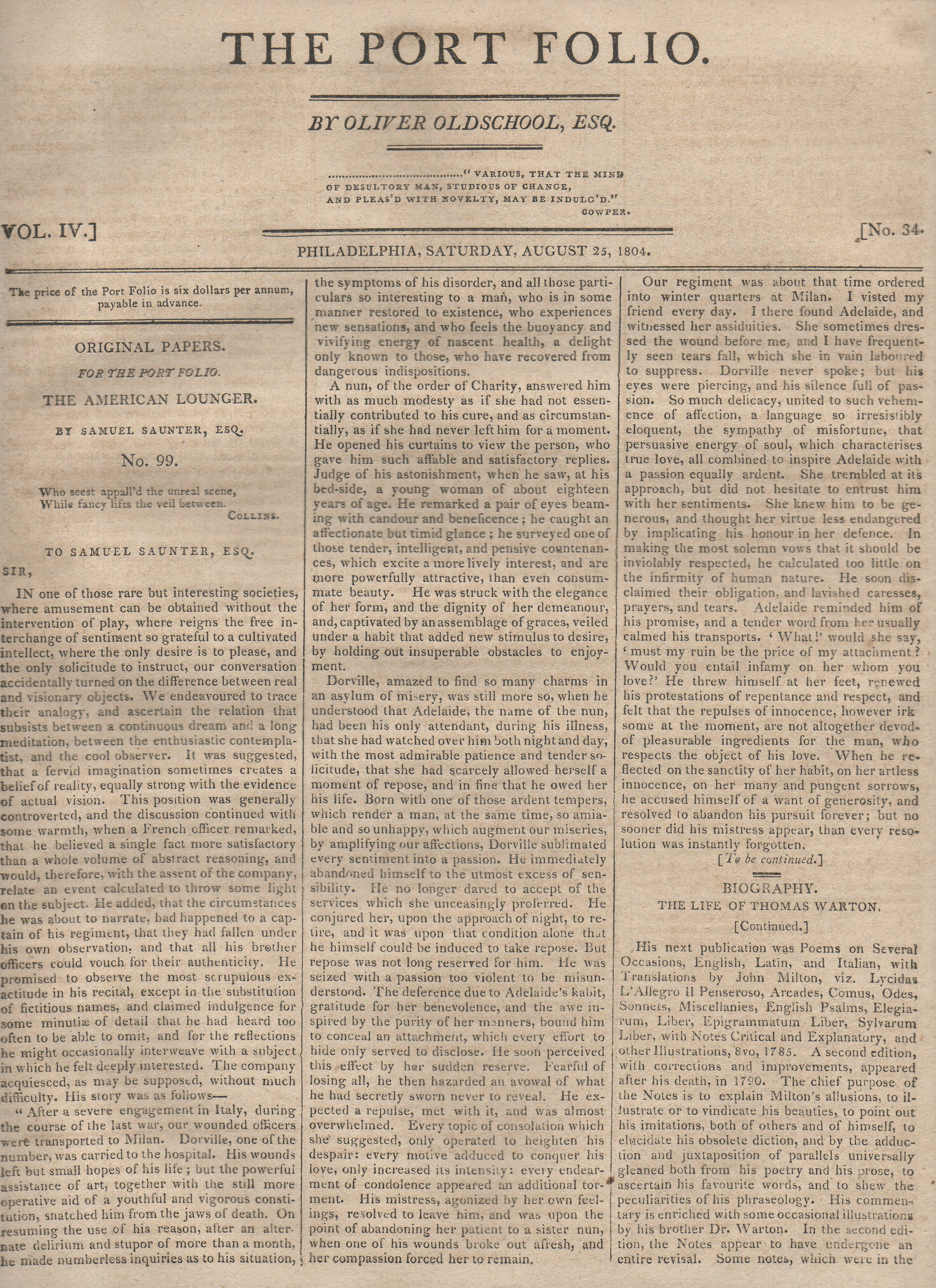
Cover of The Port Folio

The controversy began in 1818, 43 years after the Battle of Bunker Hill, when Henry Dearborn, who at the time was a Major General, published an account of his experience as a young captain at Bunker Hill in the April 1818 edition of The Port Folio, a Philadelphia-based publication and leading political journal. At the time Dearborn was running for governor of Massachusetts against the incumbent John Brooks. Being a Republican in a largely Federalist state, Dearborn badly needed favorable press on his side. When Charles Miner, the editor of The Port Folio, asked Dearborn to verify and edit a British soldier's map depicting the Battle of Bunker Hill, he jumped at the opportunity. However Dearborn went further than that and gave a 14-page account of the battle. In the process he accused the now deceased General Putnam, a popular patriot and Revolutionary War veteran, of incompetence, cowardly leadership and failing to provide support for the retreating American troops. Dearborn's accusations were completely unexpected and generally frowned upon, causing a political and a soon to be social controversy throughout New York and New England that lasted generations. (Note: At that late date Dearborn was already unpopular in Federalist New England from his days serving under President Thomas Jefferson as Secretary of War, and under President James Madison as a General Commander in the War of 1812, a war that most Federalists bitterly opposed.)

Putnam's son, Colonel Daniel Putnam, angered by what he regarded as an unprovoked attack on his deceased father's character, came to his defense in a later issue of The Port Folio. Colonel Henry A. S. Dearborn, the General's son, in like fashion responded by assisting his father and supported his position. Both families earnestly collected veterans' depositions to substantiate their claims. Others entered the debate, including the popular Daniel Webster who published a pro-Putnam account in the North American Review, while Massachusetts Governor Brooks, a veteran of the battle at Bunker Hill, toured the battle site to refute General Dearborn's account of the battle.

For Dearborn, who recently suffered defeat as a Republican gubernatorial candidate, the controversy provided an opportunity to regain political prominence, while Federalists saw it as a way to besmirch Dearborn, embrace Putnam, and regain lost political favor for their party.

There was general disagreement regarding individual contributions during the battle—many somewhat contradictory accounts had to be considered.

=== Dearborn's 1818 account ===
During the battle Dearborn served under Colonel John Stark at the front lines, near the right end of the rail fence. In his controversial account published in The Port Folio on April 29, 1818, Dearborn directly attacked the integrity of Putnam's involvement at the Battle, maintaining:

I heard the gallant Col. Prescott (who commanded in the redoubt) observe, after the war, at the table of his Excellency James Bowdoin, then Governor of this Commonwealth, " that he sent three messengers during the battle to Gen. Putnam, requesting him to come forward and take the command, there being no general officer present, and the relative rank of the Colonel not having been settled; but that he received no answer, and his whole conduct was such, both during the action and the retreat, that he ought to have been shot." He remained at or near the top of Bunker Hill until the retreat, with Col. Gerrish by his side; I saw them together when we retreated. He not only continued at that distance himself during the whole of the action, but had a force with him nearly as large as that engaged. No reinforcement of men or ammunition was sent to our assistance; and, instead of attempting to cover the retreat of those who had expended their last shot in the face of the enemy, he retreated in company with Col. Gerrish, and his whole force, without discharging a single musket; but what is still more astonishing, Col. Gerrish was arrested for cowardice, tried, cashiered, and universally execrated; while not a word was said against the conduct of Gen. Putnam, whose extraordinary popularity alone saved him, not only from trial, but even from censure.

— Henry Dearborn

=== Daniel Putnam's account ===
The most frequently published response to the accusations levied at the late General Putnam by Dearborn was from his son Colonel Daniel Putnam which was first published in the July 1818 issue of The Port Folio, approximately two months after Dearborn's article appeared there. The younger Putnam, apparently perplexed as to Dearborn's motives, expressed:

What, Sir, could tempt you at this distant period to disturb the ashes of the dead, and thus, in the face of truth, to impose on the public such a miserable libel on the fair fame of a man who "exhausted his bodily strength, and expended the vigor of a youthful constitution in the service of his country"? What, above all things, could induce you to assail the character of General Putnam in a point most of all others, perhaps, unassailable; and to impeach with cowardice, a man always foremost in danger, a man, of whom it was proverbially said, as well by British as Provincial officers, that, in a service of great peril and hardship, from 1755 to 1763. He dared to lead where any dared to follow?

— Daniel Putnam

The younger Putnam's article attempted to present a point by point refutation of Dearborn's account. Claiming that "like an assassin in the dark cowardly mediated this insidious blow against...a character as much above your level, as your base calumny is beneath a Gentleman and an Officer."

Dearborn's account of General Putnam's conduct was based upon his personal memories of the battle at Bunker Hill, some 43 years previous, whereas the younger Putnam, though not present at the battle, consulted and collected depositions from past veterans of the battle. He also presented a letter of thanks from George Washington to his father, written at the end of the war, with the idea that the greatly loved Washington, whose fame and reputation served as a protective shield, would never thank a man that acted as Dearborn had contended.

Among the depositions was one from Thomas Grosvenor, present at the battle, contending that the most active officers at the area about the redoubt and the rail fence were indeed General Putnam along with Colonel Prescott and Captain Thomas Knowlton. and that Dearborn's accusations were based either on ignorance or misrepresentation.

== Historical accounts of the battle ==
Henry S. Commager, a scholar of the Revolutionary War, maintains that the best American accounts (Note: referred to as primary sources by historians) of the battle were recorded by ordinary soldiers and from civilian onlookers. British accounts, however, were primarily recorded by British generals such as Generals Howe, Gage and Burgoyne. He further maintains that the British accounts, although well written and chronicled, seemed as if they were prepared to be read in Parliament. The American accounts of the battle, though generally lacking in formal presentation, were direct and definitive, and possessed no sense of defeat or despair, though somewhat lacking in overall organization, reflecting the unconventional fighting style of the Americans. The witness accounts of both the Americans and the British naturally lent themselves to a fair measure of national pride respectively.

=== Veteran accounts ===
Veteran accounts of Putnam's involvement in the battle materialized at different times in the years that immediately followed Dearborn's initial accusations as published in The Port Folio in 1818. Veteran accounts of the battle often consisted of letters or depositions chronologized and published under one cover. Occasionally witness accounts of those caught up in the horror and confusion of battle would subsequently present themselves with a varying degree of inconsistency with other such accounts. Some of the accounts supported Dearborn's perspective while others supported the idea that Putnam was much more active and enthusiastic. A fair number of these accounts, however, claim that when the actual fighting began Putnam was not on the front line at the rail fence, where Captain Dearborn and Colonel Benjamin Pierce and his companies were positioned. Several of the accounts about Putnam have him overseeing the effort to fortify Bunker Hill behind front lines or making rides to nearby Cambridge to request reinforcements.

In support of Dearborn's position, Pierce in 1818 maintained: "I have read your "Account of the Battle of Bunker's-hill," and consider it to be more like the thing itself, than any statement I have ever seen.

General Francis V. Green who was present during the battle maintained, "No one exercised general command" and "Putnam did practically nothing as a commanding General."

Colonel Samuel Swett later maintained that Putnam came upon Captain Ford and his company and directed them to bring deserted field pieces to the rail fence and bring them to bear on the British advance.

=== Contemporary publications ===
Reviewing the controversy as it unfolded and was printed in the North American Review, the nationally popular Daniel Webster followed both Dearborn and Putnam, and said of the controversy that the issues concerned duty and character. Webster suggested that Dearborn stepped beyond the line of common decency by attempting to reprehend a widely respected war veteran who gave much of his life serving his country and who had long since been dead. In support of Putnam, Webster also provided several depositions from Colonels John Trumbull and Thomas Grosvenor along with various testimony from lesser known soldiers present at the battle, all of whom offered a different account of Putnam from Dearborn's.

The New Hampshire Patriot on May 1, 1810, reported Stark's disappointment with Putnam: "...as Stark proceeded to the rail fence in full view of Putnam, seen conversing with Colonel Gerrish, the Connecticut General supplied "no direction" to Stark. Hence, Putnam exercised no command and failed to take any initiative, a view roughly resembling Dearborn's comments.

Trumbull - Colonel John Trumbull served as a military artist during the Revolution and was present during the Battle of Bunker Hill. After reading Dearborn's account in The Port Folio, Trumbull wrote a letter to the late General Putnam's son, Daniel, expressing his regrets and disappoint over Dearborn's accusations, defending the general's character and role in the battle. Trumbull maintains that Putnam was at the redoubt and saved the life of British officer, Colonel John Small, an old friend of Putnam's who he fought with during the French and Indian War, by ordering colonial soldiers not to fire at him in his defenseless state. His letter was later published, along with other veteran accounts, in the 1818 Munroe & Francis publication of Dearborn's and Putnam's accounts.

Humphreys – In 1818, Colonel David Humphreys, once an aide de camp to Washington and once on the staff of General Putnam, published his book, entitled Israel Putnam where he roundly lends support to the character of Putnam in several incidents during the battle.

- Essay on the Life of Israel Putnam

The lie, however improbable or monstrous, which has once assumed the semblance of truth, by being often repeated with minute and plausible particulars, is, at length, so thoroughly established, as to obtain universal credit, defy contradiction, and frustrate every effort of refutation. Such is the mischief, such are the unhappy consequences on the bewildered mind, that the reader has no alternative, but to become the dupe of his credulity, or distrust the veracity of almost all human testimony.

— David Humphreys

Swett – Colonel Samuel Swett published an account about the Battle of Bunker Hill which covered many of the activities of Putnam. His Sketch of Bunker Hill Battle, published in 1818, was presented as an appendix to Colonel David Humphreys' book, Israel Putnam which was addressed to the State Society of the Cincinnati in Connecticut. The account of Swett has been substantially followed in Rand, Avery & Co.'s Bunker Hill Centennial. Swett's first publication was criticized by David Lee Child, in the Boston Patriot, Nov. 17, 1818, claiming that General Putnam was not engaged in the actual battle. Child's article was later reprinted as an Enquiry into the "Conduct of General Putnam". In 1826, Swett published his second book History of Bunker Hill battle: With a plan. The 19th century contemporary historian Alden Bradford in his book A Particular Account of the Battle of Bunker claims some accounts of the battle were partial and incomplete and maintains that Colonel Swett's account is "the most correct and perfect account" he has ever read. Both the publications of Humphreys and Swett present accounts of Putnam's involvements that tend to undermine Dearborn's accusations:

Humphreys and Swett – In 1847 Humphreys and Swett published a book entitled The Life and Heroic Exploits of Israel Putnam which upheld the character of Putnam altogether. Among the accounts of Putnam during the battle is one which has him on horseback, putting himself between the charging British and the retreating Americans, commanding that they stay and renew the fight.

Child – In 1819 David Lee Child published an account that contained and critiqued various depositions of witnesses of Putnam's involvement and found several significant inconsistencies regarding Putnam's whereabouts during the retreat. Child notes that the deposition of Heuben Kemp places Putnam at Breastwork, while the deposition of Alexander Davidson has Putnam during the same time at the rail fence, instructing Captain Ford to bring two field pieces to the rail fence, and then claims that after they were fired a number of times the British advance came close the musket firing commenced and Putnam disappeared during the firing, smoke and confusion. Child also rebukes claims made by Colonel Samuel Swett's publication of 1818, Historical and topographical sketch of Bunker Hill battle, maintaining that he had proved Col. Swett misrepresented entirely the statement of Davidson...

Child maintains that the only proof that Putnam was at the redoubt during the action is letter written by John Trumbull, who, years after the battle, had a conversation with British Colonel John Small in London. Small had claimed that he was in the advancing British line during the second attack on the redoubt and that almost everyone in front was killed or wounded by a volley fired from within the redoubt. Small says he was not hit but thought for sure he was about to be killed as several of the rebels trained their muskets on him, at which point Putnam reportedly shouted to the rebels "For God's sake lads, don't fire at that man; I love him as I do my brother!" Child dismisses the story that Small was out in front of the line, knowing at the time that the rebels had proved to be excellent marksman and were earnestly picking off British officers, and because it was customary for British officers to march behind rank and file, especially when they are advancing and preparing for a charge with fixed bayonets.

Coffin – The controversy was kept alive when in 1831 Charles Coffin compiled and published several accounts from American generals present at the Battle of Bunker Hill under one cover, entitled: History of the Battle of Breed's Hill. The publication contained the individual accounts of Major Generals William Heath, first published in 1798, Henry Lee, 1812, James Wilkinson, 1816, and Henry Dearborn, 1818, who were all doubtful of Putnam's overall performance during the battle.

- Extract from the Memoirs of Major-General William Heath, 1778

Just before the action began, Gen. Putnam came to the redoubt, and told Col. Prescott that the entrenching tools must be sent off, as they would be lost; the Colonel replied, that if he sent any of the men away with the tools not one of them would return; to this the General answered, they shall every man return. A large party was then sent off with the tools, and not one of them returned.

- Account of James Wilkinson, 1816,

If General Putnam had moved up with Col. Gerrish and the men who remained stationary within 600 yards of the combat, which lasted an hour and a half the triumph of the provincials would have been decisive, and those of the British corps who were not killed must have surrendered, which would probably have terminated the contest… (Note: Wilkinson corroborates Dearborn's contention that had Putnam advanced with his force, the battle could have been won.)

Fellows – The controversy was renewed again in 1843 when John Fellows, present at the Battle and former aide-de-camp to George Washington, published his book, The Veil Removed, where he introduces numerous letters and statements from veterans of the Battle regarding Putnam's performance and Dearborn's estimation of the battle overall. Several of the depositions were from notable people, further fomenting public attention, and generally consented to Dearborn's claims.

- Letter of Daniel Chaplin of Groton, and Rev. John Bullard of Pepperell, Groton, June 5, 1818, present with Prescott during the American retreat when he came upon Putnam and asked. In their statement of , they write of Prescott's encounter with Putnam:

"Why did you not support me, General, with your men, as I had reason to expect, according to agreement?" Putnam answered, "I could not drive the dogs up." Prescott pointedly said to him, "If you could not drive them up, you might have led them up."

- Letter of the Hon. Abel Parker, May 27, 1818, Judge of probate

As I was in the battle on Breed's Hill, otherwise called Bunker Hill, on the 17th day of June, 1775, and there received one ball through my leg, another having passed through my clothes, all accounts of that battle which I have seen published, have been to me extremely interesting. But I have never seen any account which I considered in any degree correct, until the one published by Gen. Dearborn.

- Letter of General Michael McClary's, Epsom, May 10, 1818

I was in the battle from its commencement to the end, and have no recollection of seeing Gen. Putnam in or near it. I was the principal part of the time the action continued near Col. Stark, who commanded the regiment to which I belonged, and on our retreat from Breed's Hill, in ascending Bunker Hill, I well remember seeing Gen. Putnam there on his horse, with a spade in his hand. Being an officer in the company under your father's command, I had an opportunity of knowing the circumstances generally attending the battle, and if Gen. Putnam had been there, that is, taken any part in it, I should have known it. I am, dear sir, &c.,"Michael McClary.

== Aftermath ==
Dearborn's accusations were not well received with most of the voters throughout New England. In his attempt to garner positive press coverage he committed a serious error by assaulting the honor of someone who was considered a notable war hero and who had long been deceased: Putnam had died in May 1790. Subsequently, Dearborn lost his bid for the governorship of Massachusetts and major controversy over Putnam's conduct followed which was covered frequently in the press. The controversy prompted a review of the battle which materialized in a number of publications for more than thirty years.

On June 17, 1825, the 50th anniversary of the Battle of Bunker Hill, the scheduled cornerstone ceremony heralded the emerging consensus about Bunker Hill. During the ceremony no controversy clouded the event and no rancor over historical rankings materialized. Many thousands of citizens came to hear Daniel Webster dedicate the memorial cornerstone. Putnam was only mentioned once, along with John Stark, John Brooks, and others as among the original survivors of the battle, while William Prescott received special mention as a brave commander who presided over the American forces.

== See also ==
- Siege of Boston
- Douglas Putnam (Grandson of Israel Putnam; Colonel in the American Civil War; Member of General Ulysses S. Grant's staff)
- Timeline of the American Revolution
- Bibliography of the American Revolutionary War
- List of American Revolutionary War battles

== Bibliography ==
- Axelrod, Alan (2007). The real History of the American Revolution. Sterling Publishing Company, New York. ISBN 9781402768163.
- Bell, J.L. (2015). "Benjamin Pierce's Story of Bunker Hill". Boston 1775.
- Bobrick, Benson (1997). Angle in the Whirlwind – The Triumph of the American Revolution. Simon and Schuster, New York. ISBN 9781451628555., 553 pages
- Bradford, Alden (1825). A Particular Account of the Battle of Bunker, Or Breed's Hill, on the 17th of June, 1775. Cummings, Hilliard.
- Child, David Lee (1819). An enquiry into the conduct of General Putnam, in relation to the battle of Bunker, or Breed's Hill. Thomas G.Bangs, Boston., 56 pages
- Heath, William; Lee, Henry; Dearborn, Henry; Wilkinson, James (1831). Charles Coffin (ed.). History of the Battle of Breed's Hill. D. C. Colesworthy, printer.
- Commager, Henry Steele; Morris, Richard B. (1958). The Spirit of 76. Harper & Row Publishers, New York, London. ISBN 0306806207., eBook (Vol 2)
- Covart, Elizabeth M. (June 18, 2013). "Bunker Hill Monument and Memory". Journal of the American Revolution.
- Cray, Robert E. Jr. (2001). "Bunker Hill Refought: Memory Wars and Partisan Conflicts, 1775–1825" (PDF). Historical Journal of Massachusetts Volume 29, No. 1. Archived from the original (PDF) on 2016-05-05.
- Dearborn, Henry; Putnam, Daniel (1818). An Account of the Battle of Bunker Hill. Munroe & Francis, Boston.
- Peckham, Howard Henry (1974). The Toll Of Independence. The University of Chicago Press. ISBN 9780226653181.
- ——; Dearborn, Henry (2009). Revolutionary War Journals of Henry Dearborn, 1775–1783. Heritage Books. ISBN 9780788401244., 282 pages
- Drake, Samuel Adams (1875). Bunker Hill: The Story Told in Letters from the Battle Field by British Officers Engaged. Nichols and Hall, 76 pages.
- Ellis, Joseph J. (2007). American Creation. Alfred A. Knopf, New York.
- Fellows, John (2009). The Veil Removed. Applewood Books. ISBN 9781429017237.
- Ferling, John (2015). Whirlwind, The American Revolution and the War That Won it. Bloomsbury Press, New York, London. ISBN 9781620401736., 432 pages
- Ferling, John (2007). Almost a Miracle. Oxford University Press. ISBN 9780199758470.
- French, Allen (1911). The Siege of Boston. The Macmillan Company, Boston.
- Frothingham, Richard (1890). Battle OF Bunker Hill. Little, Brown & Company, Boston, 136 pages.
- Frothingham, Richard; Swett, Samuel (1850). The Command in the Battle of bunker Hill. Charles C. Little & James brown, Boston.
- Kosiorek, Jeffery Anthony (2006). Revolutionary Commemoration, Liberty, and Republicanism in Nineteenth-century America. ISBN 9780542912337., 325 pages
- Lanning, Michael Lee (2008). The American Revolution 100. Source Books, Naperville, Illinois. ISBN 9781402252808.
- Livingston, William Farrand (1901). Israel Putnam, Pioneer, Ranger, and Major-General 1718–1790. Knickerbocker Press, New York & London. ISBN 9780598058287.
- McCabe, James D. (1871). Great Republic of the American Union. William B. Evans & Co., Philadelphia.
- Middlekauff, Robert (2005). The Glorious Cause. Oxford University Press. ISBN 9780199740925.
- Moran, Donald N. (1985). "The Battle of Bunker Hill". Valley Compatriot Newsletter. Archived from the original on December 1, 2007.
- Morris, Charles (1902). The Great Republic by the Master Historians. R.S. Belcher Company.
- Willey, George Franklyn (1903). State Builders: An Illustrated Historical and Biographical Record of the State of New Hampshire. State Builders Publishing, Manchester, NH.
- Phillips, Kevin (2012). 1775 – A Good Year for Revolution. Penguin Books. ISBN 9781101601082.
- Putnam, Alfred P. (1901). Gen Israel Putnam and the Battle of Bunker Hill. Salem, Massachusetts. ISBN 9780795035135., 65 pages
- Putnam, Daniel (1860). Colonel Daniel Putnam's letter relative to the battle of Bunker Hill and General Israel Putnam. Hartford : Connecticut Historical Society., 38 pages
- Smith, Page (1976). A New Age Now Begins. McGraw-Hill Book Company. ISBN 9780070590977.
- Humphrys, David; Swett, Samuel (1818). Historical and topographical sketch of Bunker Hill battle. Samuel Avery, Boston., 288 pages
- Swett, Samuel (1826). History of Bunker Hill battle: With a plan. Munroe and Francis., 88 pages
- Humphrys, David; Swett, Samuel (1847). The Life and Heroic Exploits of Israel Putnam. Samuel Avery, Boston., 190 pages
- Taylor, Alan (2010). The Civil War of 1812. Alfred A Knopf, New York, 623 pages. ISBN 9780679776734.
- Ward, Christopher (1952). The War of the Revolution, Volume 1. Macmillan, 989 pages.
- Willey, George Franklyn (1903). State Builders: An Illustrated Historical and Biographical Record of the State of New Hampshire. State Builders Publishing, Manchester, NH.
- Winsor, Justin (1880). The Reader's Handbook of the American Revolution, 1761–1783. Houghton, Osgood and Company, Riverside press, Cambridge., 328 pages

=== Further reading ===
- Beck, Derek W. (2016). The War Before Independence: 1775–1776. Sourcebooks, Inc. ISBN 9781492633105., 480 pages
- Coffin, Charles (1845). The Lives and Services of Major General John Thomas, Colonel Thomas Knowlton, Colonel Alexander Scammell, Major General Henry Dearborn. Egbert, Hovey & King.
- Ristow, W. Walter (1979). Cartography of the Battle of Bunker Hill.
- Swett, Samuel (1850). Who was the Commander at Bunker Hill?: With Remarks on Frothingham's History of the Battle. John Wilson publisher (reprinted in 2014)., 39 pages
