= The Death of General Warren at the Battle of Bunker's Hill, June 17, 1775 =

Painting series by John Trumbull

The Death of General Warren at the Battle of Bunker's Hill, June 17, 1775.
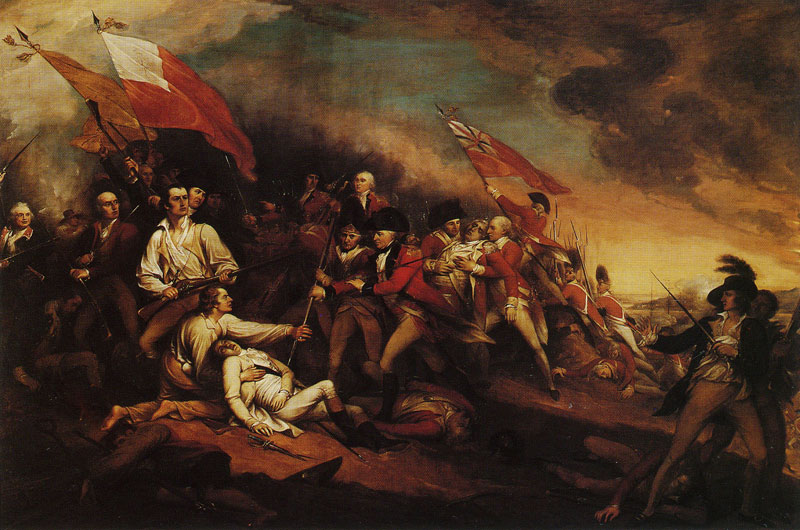
- Artist: John Trumbull
- Medium: oil on canvas
- Dimensions: 184.2 cm × 274.5 cm (72.5 in × 108.1 in)
- Location: Wadsworth Atheneum, Hartford, Connecticut, U.S.

The Death of General Warren at the Battle of Bunker's Hill, June 17, 1775
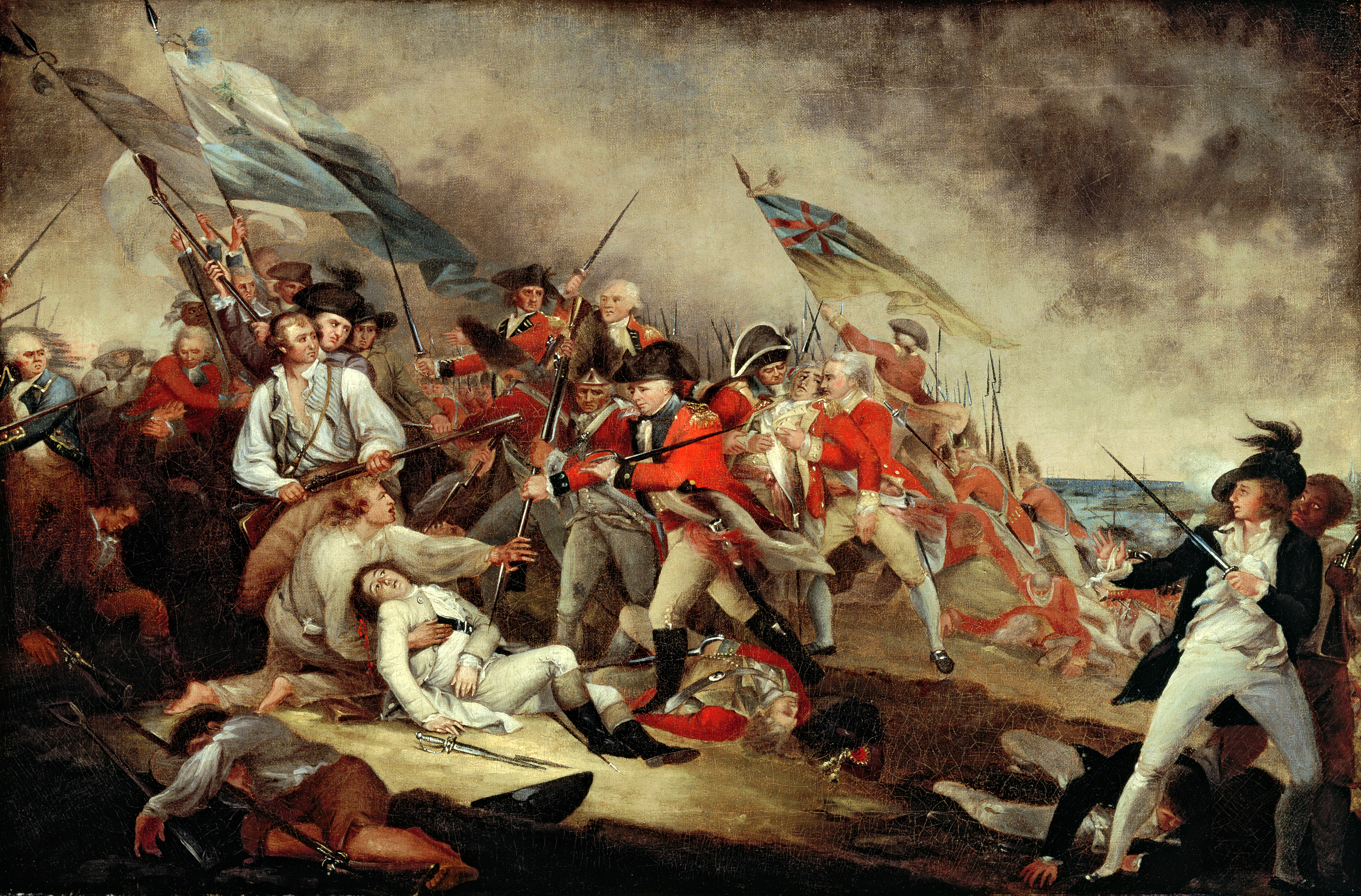
- Artist: John Trumbull
- Medium: oil on canvas
- Dimensions: 50.16 cm × 75.56 cm (19 3/4 in × 29 3/4 in)
- Location: Museum of Fine Arts, Boston

The Death of General Warren at the Battle of Bunker's Hill, June 17, 1775 refers to several oil paintings completed in the late 18th and early 19th century by the American artist John Trumbull depicting the death of Founding Father Joseph Warren at the June 17, 1775, Battle of Bunker Hill, during the American Revolutionary War. Warren, an influential Massachusetts physician and politician, had been commissioned as a general but served in the battle as a private. He was killed during or shortly after the storming of the redoubt atop Breed's Hill by a British officer.

The paintings are iconic images of the American Revolution. Trumbull painted several versions, including the one held by the Museum of Fine Arts, Boston (dated between 1815 and 1831). This was commissioned by the Warren family and passed down through the family before being acquired by the museum. Another, larger version (dated 1834) is held by the Wadsworth Atheneum in Hartford, Connecticut. Trumbull sold the engraving rights for both this painting and The Death of General Montgomery in the Attack on Quebec, December 31, 1775, which resulted in a highly successful subscription release that greatly enhanced his career.

== Event ==
Artist John Trumbull (1756–1843) was in the colonial army camp at Roxbury, Massachusetts on June 17, 1775, the day of the Battle of Bunker Hill. He watched the battle unfold through field glasses, and later decided to depict one of its central events. Joseph Warren, a Massachusetts politician and member of the colony's Committee of Safety, volunteered to serve under Colonel William Prescott in the defense of the redoubt which the colonists had constructed on top of Breed's Hill. This redoubt was the target of three British attacks, of which the first two were repulsed. The third attack succeeded, in part because the defenders had run out of ammunition. Warren was struck by a musket or pistol ball during the evacuation of the redoubt, and killed instantly.

== Description ==
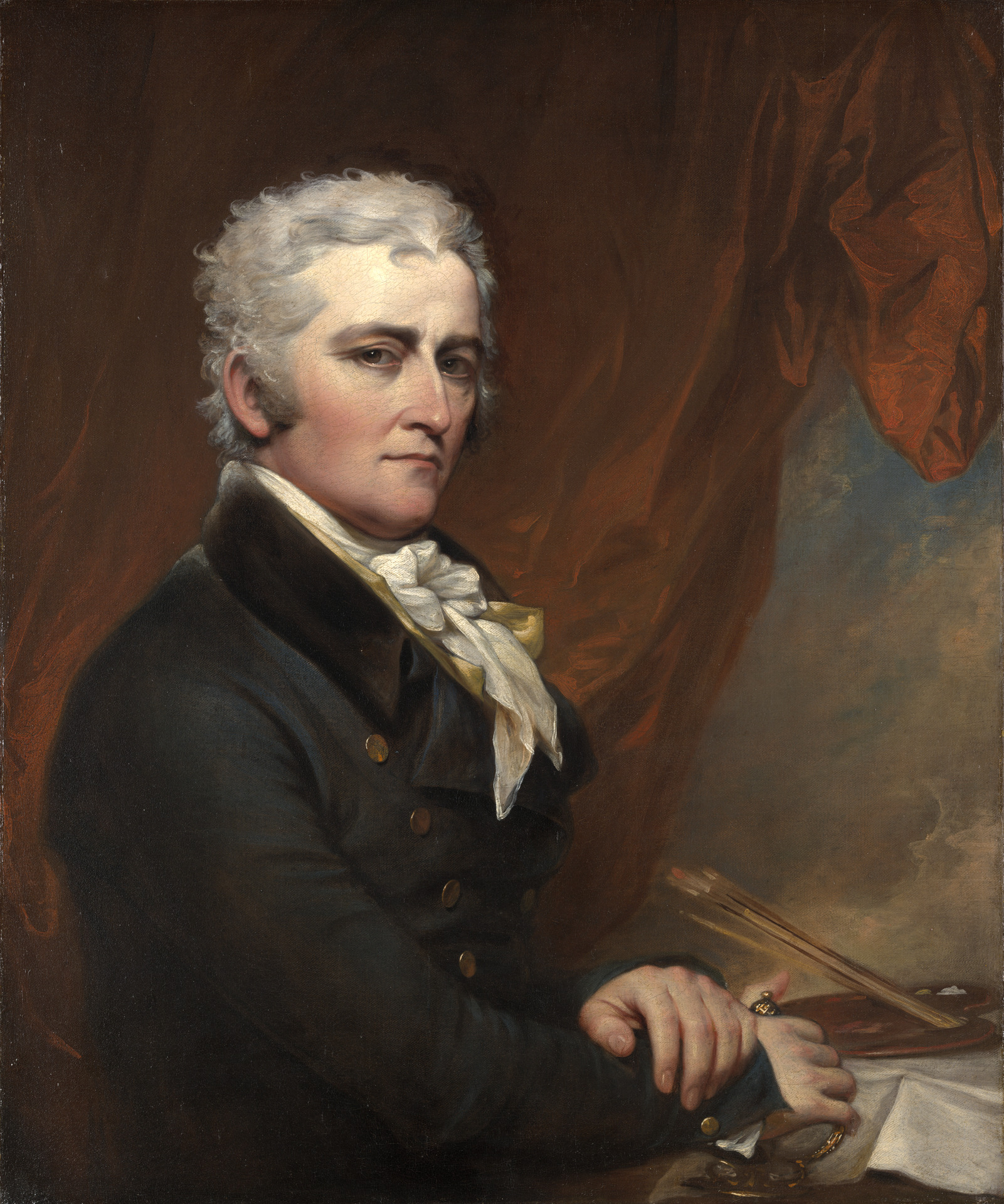
Self-portrait of John Trumbull

The central focus of the painting is Warren's body, dressed in white, and British Major John Small dressed in a scarlet uniform (holding a sword in his left hand). Small, who had served with American general Israel Putnam during the French and Indian War, is shown preventing a fellow soldier from bayoneting Warren. Trumbull wanted to express the poignancy in the conflict of men who had earlier served together.

On the far right of the painting is a colonial officer, Thomas Grosvenor, with a black man holding a musket behind him. The black man was long thought to be Peter Salem, a freed slave who served in the cause of American independence. Later research identified him as a slave belonging to Grosvenor.

The foreground is littered with bodies from both sides of the conflict, and the background includes clusters of American and British troops carrying flags. Boston Harbor is also visible in the distance. The sky is partially obscured by smoke rising from Charlestown, which had been set aflame by the British.

In describing the painting for a catalogue of his works, Trumbull explained why he chose to emphasize Small's role, saying that Small, whom he had met in London, "was equally distinguished by acts of humanity and kindness to his enemies, as by bravery and fidelity to the cause he served."

== People depicted ==
External videos
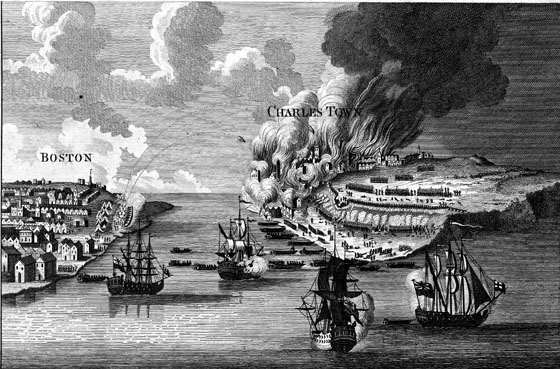
- Lecture 8, John Trumbull and Historical Fiction: The Battle of Bunker's Hill, June 17, 1775 (1786), 56 minutes, Yale University Courses, Yale University

=== British soldiers ===
- Major John Small, the officer stepping over an injured Abercrombie to hold back the bayonet of a fellow soldier
- Major John Pitcairn, falling back dying in his son's (Lieutenant Pitcairn's) arms
- General Henry Clinton, bare-headed officer with raised sword at the rear, center of the painting
- General William Howe, standing to the left of Clinton from the viewer's point of view with his sword pointing forward.
- Lord Rawdon, then a lieutenant, holds the regimental colour of the fifth regiment of foot, center-right in the painting
- Lieutenant Colonel James Abercrombie, the officer laying injured underneath John Small and at General Warren's feet.

=== Colonists ===
- Joseph Warren, Founding Father
- Thomas Grosvenor, soldier to the far right
- An African-American slave of Grosvenor, shown behind the officer
- Major Andrew McClary
- A black freeman, possibly Peter Salem, head visible below the flags on the left side of the painting
- General Israel Putnam, colonial officer on the far left of the painting
- Thomas Knowlton, standing over Warren and holding a musket
- Lieutenant-Colonel Moses Parker of Chelmsford is depicted sitting wounded to the left of Warren
- Colonel Thomas Gardner lying on ground lower right. Both Gardner and Parker were taken prisoner, and both died in early July in Boston.
- Colonel William Prescott, a commander if minutemen
