= Portrait of Henry Dearborn =

Painting by Gilbert Stuart

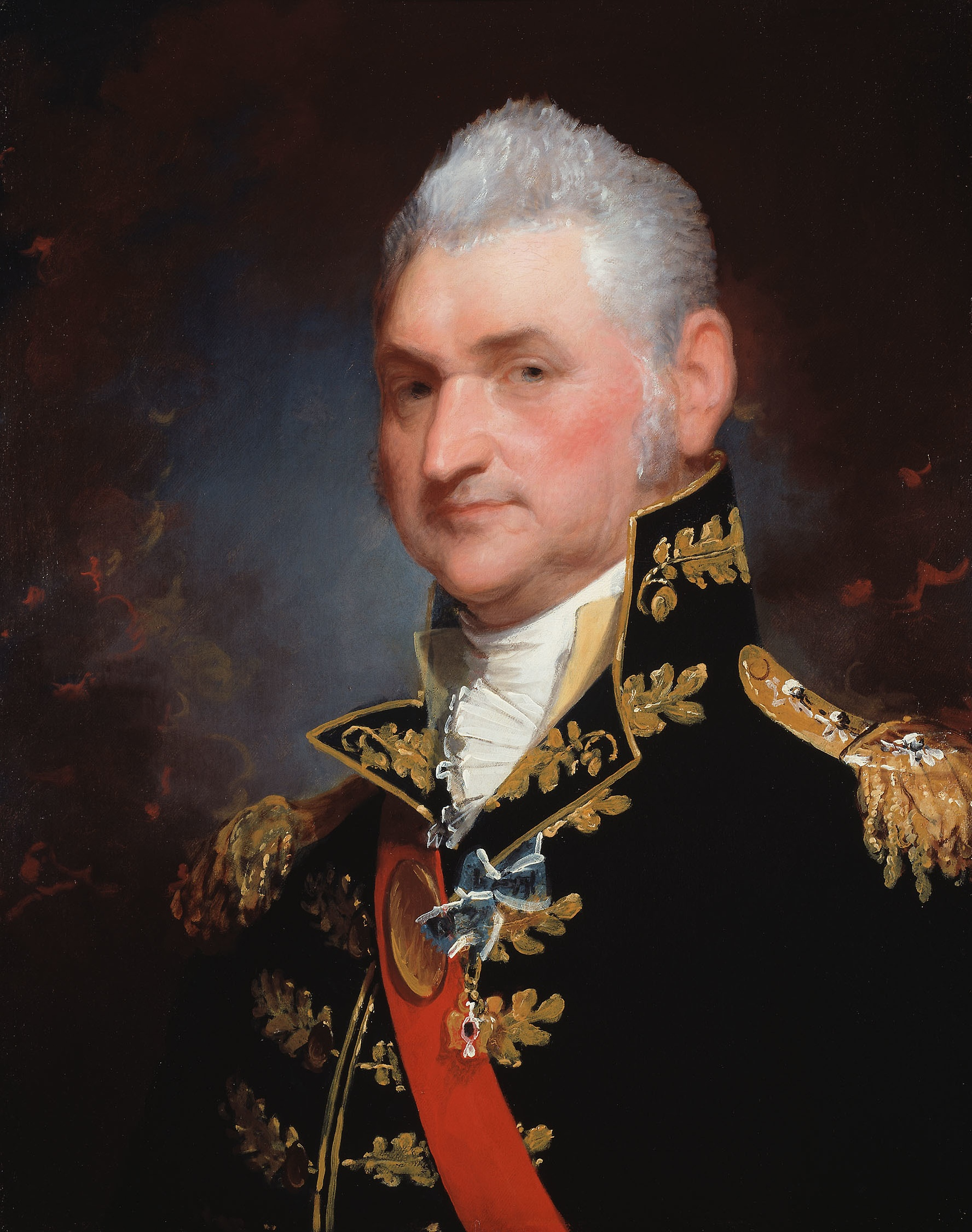
- Artist: Gilbert Stuart
- Year: 1812
- Type: Oil on Panel, portrait painting
- Dimensions: 71.5 cm × 57.1 cm (28.1 in × 22.5 in)
- Location: Art Institute of Chicago, Chicago

Portrait of Henry Dearborn is an 1812 portrait painting by the American artist Gilbert Stuart depicting the soldier, politician and diplomat Henry Dearborn. A veteran of the American Revolutionary War, he served as Secretary of War from 1801 to 1809 during the Presidency of Thomas Jefferson. In the War of 1812 he was made Commanding General of the United States Army and led the Invasion of Canada.

Stuart, a London-trained artist, had returned to the United States in 1793 and painted many members of the American elite over the following three decades. Both he and Dearborn lived in Roxbury and the general sat for him there in early 1812 before being called away to military service on the Canadian frontier. Dearborn is portrayed in the dress uniform of a brigadier general, embroidered with oak leaves and wearing the medal of the Society of the Cincinnati to which he belonged. Today it is in the collection of the Art Institute of Chicago in Illinois.

== Bibliography ==
- Barratt, Carrie Rebora & Miles, Ellen G. Gilbert Stuart. Metropolitan Museum of Art, 2004.
- McLanathan, Richard B. K. Gilbert Stuart. Abrams, 1986.
- Moore, Robert & Haynes, John Michael. Lewis & Clark, Tailor Made, Trail Worn: Army Life, Clothing & Weapons of the Corps of Discovery. Farcountry Press, 2003.
