= Howard Henry Peckham =

American historian (1910–1995)

- Born: July 13, 1910; Lowell, Michigan, U.S.
- Died: July 6, 1995 (aged 84); Hendersonville, North Carolina, U.S.
- Education: University of Michigan (BA, MA)
- Occupations: Professor and historian
- Known for: Advancing standards for management of historical manuscripts; Discovering new numbers of Revolutionary War deaths
- Spouse: Dorothy Koth Peckham
- Children: 2

Howard Henry Peckham (July 13, 1910 – July 6, 1995) was an American academic and historian, an authority on colonial and early American history.

Peckham played a fundamental role in establishing professional academic standards for the management of historical manuscripts. He was a founding member of the Society of American Archivists and the Director of the William L. Clements Library at the University of Michigan. Peckham and his associate, Lloyd A. Brown, were the first historians to publish the American Revolutionary War journals of Henry Dearborn, in 1939. He is also noted for establishing more accurate, greater numbers for American Revolutionary War deaths.

== Early life and education ==
Howard Henry Peckham was a native of Lowell, Michigan. He grew up in a typical small American town—his family having emigrated from New England and New York. Herman Algernon Peckham, Peckham's father, on his way in establishing a successful business career, died when Howard was an infant.

After graduating from Lowell High School, Peckham first attended Olivet College, then transferred to the University of Michigan just as the Great Depression began. American history was one of his main interests, but English was his greatest enthusiasm. Peckham earned his B.A. degree in 1931 and his M.A. in English in 1933.

In 1936 he married Dorothy Koth Peckham, with whom he had a son and daughter. His wife, also a lover of books, had considerable academic and literary abilities herself. When Peckham was diagnosed with diabetes in mid career, Dorothy's culinary ability and vigilant eye minimized the effects on his daily routine and allowed him to perform throughout the remainder of his life.

== Academic career ==
Peckham was an alumnus of the University of Michigan. As an undergraduate, he worked as a student reporter for The Michigan Daily newspaper and began his association with the William Clements Library in 1929. Returning to his home town of Lowell, Peckham began his literary career as an editorial writer for The Grand Rapids Press. In 1935, on a chance return visit to Ann Arbor and Michigan University, Randolph G. Adams, the Clements Library's first director who had been always been impressed with Peckham as a student, offered him the position of Assistant Curator of the library. Within a year Peckham had become the head curator, holding this post until 1945. In little time he essentially created the Manuscript Division, making it a separate department of the library.

The Clements Library had first opened its doors in 1923. When Mr. Clements was active, funding for the library was plentiful and the university's library had amassed an extensive collection of Revolutionary era manuscripts, journals, documents, pamphlets, and books, along with a huge assortment of atlases and maps. In the process, the library's collection had become much greater than collections of older institutions, and Peckham devoted much time to sorting and organizing these documents. Under his management, the library provided a rich environment of archival knowledge and education for students and scholars pursuing the study of early American history. When the Great Depression came, however, William Clements suffered severe financial loss and subsequently made out his will, reluctantly asking that the university purchase the valuable collection of manuscripts. Clements died in 1934. An optimistic Adams, still the library's director, saved the collection by prevailing upon Tracy W. McGregor, who had joined the Library's Committee of Management the year before Clements' death. McGregor donated $100,000 to the library, saving the collection from sale and ultimate dispersal among the private sector. (Note: In 1925 McGregor also established the McGregor Fund of Michigan with a gift of $5,000, one of Michigan's first charitable foundations.)

=== Manuscript findings ===
In 1937 the Clements Library acquired a collection of manuscripts and papers belonging to British Generals Thomas Gage and Sir Henry Clinton, and to American General Nathanael Greene and other such revolutionary notables. Most of the documents were untouched, still in original packages and bundles. It was the most notable collection of Revolutionary War documents ever acquired by an American library at one time. Peckham was given the rare opportunity of being the first person to oversee, sort, and manage this abundance of historical material. Under Peckham, the library had established an international reputation as a leading institution for the study of the Revolutionary War and British Colonial America, and in the process established professional standards for the management of manuscripts.

Peckham worked closely with Carl Van Doren on his Secret History of the American Revolution (1941), editing documents from the Clinton Papers that revealed Benedict Arnold's treason. In 1937 he was a founding member of the Society of American Archivists. He was the first person to unfold, sort, and read the most historically significant collection of Revolutionary War documents ever to come into the possession of an American library, about which Life did an exclusive story.

Peckham authored informative histories of the colonial wars and the American Revolutionary War that wielded much scholarly influence. His works also included histories of the state of Indiana and the University of Michigan. Peckham was a founder and contributor to American Heritage and president of the American Association for State and Local History.

Peckham left the University of Michigan in 1945 and became the director of Indiana State Library and Historical Bureau and Secretary of the Indiana Historical Society the same year, where he subsequently began establishing professional standards for historical society work. During his eight years in Indiana Peckham acquired a great appreciation and love for the state and wrote two books (Note: A Brief History of Indiana, (1946); Indiana: A Bicentennial History, (1978)) on the history of that state. He was in charge of both the library's various educational programs and its publications. While at Indiana he contributed to its collection of manuscripts, rare books, and historical maps of the original Northwest Territory. Peckham returned to Ann Arbor in 1953, shortly after the death of former director Randolph Adams, and was formally appointed Director of Clements Library, where he began greatly expanding the library's colonial and revolutionary collections, personally contributing many important manuscripts for the early American and antebellum periods.

Peckham later chaired the University Bicentennial Committee and in 1966 was Secretary to the Regents for the President's Selection Committee.

=== Later years ===
By the middle of the 1970s, Peckham and his wife decided for health reasons to move to a warmer climate in Hendersonville, North Carolina, where they lived a more relaxed lifestyle. Peckham was given an honorary doctorate degree by Olivet College in 1976. He continued his writing, turning out occasional historical articles. He also taught and attended a few classes at the local community college, and took up playing the bassoon in the community orchestra. He also tried his hand at writing a novel.

In Peckham's 1974 work, The Toll of Independence, he painstakingly counted American military wartime casualties in the Revolutionary War and added them to the number of American soldiers who died while prisoners of war in British captivity. Peckham's investigation revealed that the number of deaths was much greater than previously assumed, which now totaled about 25,000 American deaths, a significant loss for a population that during the Revolutionary War numbered fewer than three million.

At his retirement, Peckham expressed his great enthusiasm for the Clements library, claiming and truly believing that it was the best place anywhere to acquire manuscripts and other primary sources on early American history.

== Legacy ==
Peckham died on July 6, 1995, at the age of 84 in Hendersonville, where he had lived since his 1977 retirement. He was survived by his wife, son, daughter, and three grandchildren.

Peckham was the first historian to publish the Revolutionary War Journals of Henry Dearborn, 1775–1783 in 1939, a publication that includes the six journals written by Henry Dearborn, an officer in the American Revolution who was involved in several major campaigns, and who later became Secretary of War under President Thomas Jefferson.

The William Clements Library offers several research fellowships ever year. In honor of Howard Peckham, the library offers the Howard H. Peckham Fellowship on Revolutionary America, a $10,000 annual endowment for qualifying scholars.

It is said that Peckham is remembered by his colleagues and the many scholars who came to the Clements Library as graduate students, as a kind and giving man with a courteous manner.

== Works ==
Peckham wrote (Note: A few of the works he coauthored) 21 books on early American history together with a wide assortment of articles and pamphlets. His works were aimed at the general reader; however, they were based upon solid archival research. His 1947 publication, Pontiac and the Indian Uprising, the product of meticulous scholarship, is widely acclaimed as his finest book. Peckham produced his first major work in 1939. His works include:

- Revolutionary War Journals of Henry Dearborn, 1775–1783, (1939, reprint, 2009)
- British secret writing in the revolution, 19??
- The papers of General Josiah Harmar, 1937
- A Brief History of Indiana, 1946
- Pontiac and the Indian Uprising, 1947
- Pontiac's Siege of Detroit, 1951
- Captured by Indians: True Tales of Pioneer Survivors, 1954
- The War for Independence: A Military History, 1958
- Treason of the Blackest Dye, 1958
- Memoirs of the life of John Adlum in the Revolutionary War, 1968
- Narratives of Colonial America, 1704–1765, 1971
- The Toll of Independence, 1974,
- Campaigns of the American Revolution: an atlas of manuscript maps, 1976
- The Declaration of Independence: Two Essays, 1976
- Indiana: A Bicentennial History, 1978
- The Journals and Indian Paintings of George Winter, 1837–1839, (reprint, 2013)
- The Colonial Wars, 1965
- William Henry Harrison: Young Tippecanoe,
- The War for Independence a Military History, 1975
- Lexington to Fallen Timbers, 1775–1794; Episodes from the Earliest History of Our Military Forces – Primary Source Edition, (reprint, 2014)
- The Making of the University of Michigan, 1817–1992, 1994

== See also ==
- Manuscript culture
- Archive and Archival research
- List of American Revolutionary War battles
- List of American historians
- United States military casualties of war
- American Antiquarian Society
- John Clement Fitzpatrick (another prominent archivist of early American history)
- James Kendall Hosmer American historian and librarian

== Bibliography ==
- "Howard H. Peckham". University of Michigan: Faculty History Project.
- Dearborn; Peckham (2009). Revolutionary War Journals of Henry Dearborn, 1775–1783. Heritage Books. ISBN 9780788401244. 282 pages. e'Book
- In Memory of Howard Henry Peckham (PDF). The Quatro. 1995. Archived from the original (PDF) on October 29, 2015.
- "McGregor Fund of Michigan". Media Genesis. 2016. Archived from the original on April 7, 2016.
- "The Clements Library Research Fellowships". The William L. Clements Library.
