= Mary Nuttall De Renne =

American preservationist (1835–1887)

- De Renne pictured around 1887
- Born: Mary Wallace Nuttall; May 16, 1835; Newport, Rhode Island, U.S.
- Died: August 31, 1887 (aged 52)
- Resting place: Bonaventure Cemetery, Savannah, Georgia, U.S.
- Spouse: George Wymberley Jones De Renne (1851–1880; his death)
- Children: 4, including Wymberley Jones De Renne

Mary Nuttall De Renne (born Mary Wallace Nuttall (or Nutthall); May 16, 1835 – August 31, 1887) was an American preservationist. Her collection of American Civil War relics and literature has been recognized as some of the most important in the United States.

== Early life ==
Mary Wallace Nuttall was born in Newport, Rhode Island, in 1835 to William Nuttall and Mary Savage. Her father died of a stroke the following year. Her mother later remarried, to George Noble Jones. Her stepbrothers included Noble Wimberly Jones II (1852–1882).

== Personal life ==
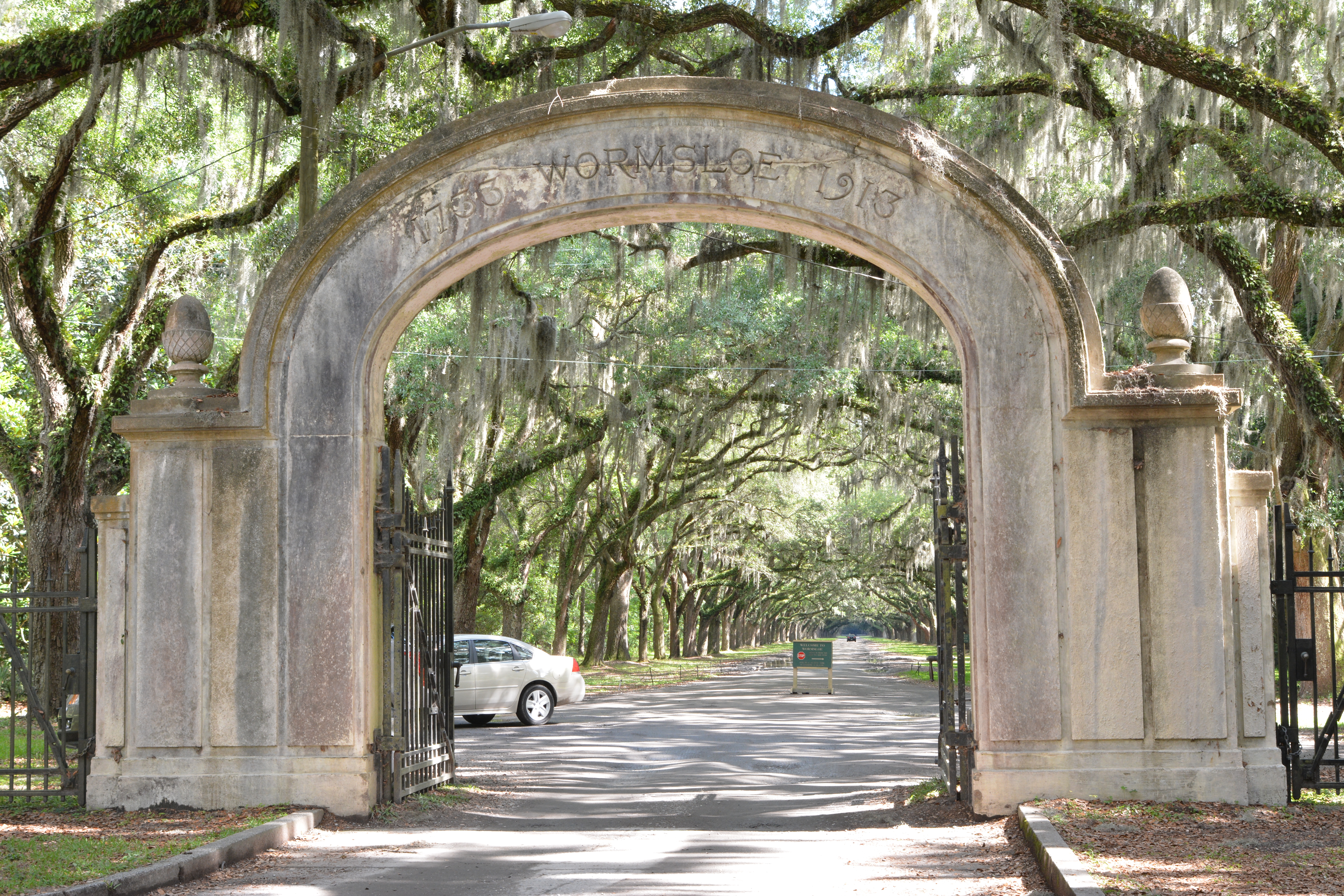
Entrance to Wormsloe

In 1851, De Renne married George Wymberley Jones De Renne, who, for a period of his life, was the wealthiest citizen of Savannah, Georgia. An owner of the Wormsloe Plantation, George collected over 1300 volumes of the history of the State of Georgia. They had four children, each of whom (but especially son Wymberley Jones De Renne) continued their father's legacy of maintaining and printing collections of Georgia's history. Wymberley Wormsloe De Renne, son of Wymberly Jones De Renne, completed what his father had not prior to his death in 1916. Wymberley Wormsloe De Renne's sister, Elfrida De Renne Barrow, was also instrumental in preserving the history of Georgia. Only first-born Wymberley Jones De Renne continued the family line.

After De Renne became a widow, she asked Charles Colcock Jones Jr. to edit the fifth of husband's Wormsloe Quartos, a compendium of unpublished colonial laws in Georgia. A sixth quarto, a journal of John James Perceval, 3rd Earl of Egmont, followed in 1886, also edited by Jones. De Renne spent her final years seeking out Civil War relics, including books and pamphlets from the Confederacy, a collection described by Douglas Southall Freeman in his A Calendar of Confederate Papers (1908) as "second to none in the country."

== Death ==
On May 18, 1880, De Renne's husband had the remains of family members (including his grandfather, Noble Wimberly Jones) contained in a brick vault at Savannah's Colonial Park Cemetery moved to a new family vault in Bonaventure Cemetery.

De Renne died in 1887, aged 52. She had survived her husband by seven years. The couple left their collections to their son Everard. Upon his death in 1894, the collection was donated to the American Civil War Museum in Richmond, Virginia. The G. W. J. De Renne Georgia Historical Collection was bequeathed to Atlanta's Georgia State Library, which catalogued it in The De Renne Gift (1894). The books were transferred to the Hargrett Rare Book and Manuscript Library at the University of Georgia in 1992.
