= De Renne Georgia Library =

Library building in Savannah, Georgia, U.S.

- Interactive map of the De Renne Georgia Library area

General information
- Architectural style: Classical Revival
- Location: Wormsloe Estate, Isle of Hope, United States
- Coordinates: 31°57′57″N 81°04′03″W
- Named for: Wymberley Jones De Renne
- Completed: 1907 (119 years ago)

Design and construction
- Architects: Henrik Wallin; Edward Warren Young

The De Renne Georgia Library is a building at the Wormsloe Historic Site, a former plantation, in Isle of Hope, Georgia, United States. Completed in 1907, to a Classical Revival design by Henrik Wallin and Edward Warren Young, the building contained a large library of the history of Georgia, a collection begun by George Wymberley Jones De Renne and continued by his son, Wymberley Jones De Renne, and grandson, Wymberley Wormsloe De Renne. The library contains the most complete collection of printed Georgia history for the period spanning 1700 to 1929.

Although the building is named for Wymberley Jones De Renne, he dedicated it to Noble Jones, the 1739 founder of Wormsloe. In 1922, the library, which was housed in a fireproof structure, was described as "the most complete private state historical collection in existence."

Wymberley Jones De Renne died in 1916, and his son, Wymberley Wormsloe De Renne, became the curator of the library, intent on completing what his father had started. He gave free rein to historian Leonard L. Mackall to fill in the spaces on the shelves of the library. Mackall worked on the project until the latter stages of World War I, after which De Renne enlisted the help of Azalea Hallett Clizbee of the American Art Association to catalog the library, which contained over 4,000 items. Further delays ensued, which led to De Renne's sisters, Audrey and Elfrida, underwriting the project. De Renne oversaw the project. The catalog was published, in three royal octavo volumes, by Plandome Press in 1931. The De Renne Georgia Library was sold to the Board of Regents of the University System of Georgia in 1938. De Renne worked on the library's staff until his retirement in 1956.

Scenes in AMC's Fear the Walking Dead season 8 episode "Anton" were filmed at the library, including in its interior.
