= Wymberley Jones De Renne =

American preservationist (1853–1916)

- De Renne pictured around 1915
- Born: September 23, 1853; Newport, Rhode Island, U.S.
- Died: June 23, 1916 (aged 62); New York City, New York, U.S.
- Resting place: Bonaventure Cemetery, Savannah, Georgia, U.S.
- Spouse: Laura Norris Camblos (1880–1913; her death)
- Children: 3, including Wymberley Wormsloe De Renne and Elfrida De Renne Barrow
- Parent(s): George Wymberley Jones De Renne; Mary Nuttall De Renne

Wymberley Jones De Renne (September 23, 1853 – June 23, 1916) was an American preservationist. He became a noted collector of literature on the history of the State of Georgia. In 1922, it was described as "the most complete private state historical collection in existence."

== Early life ==
De Renne was born in Newport, Rhode Island, in 1853, the first surviving child of George Wymberley Jones De Renne and Mary Wallace Nuttall. His parents' first-born, a son, died in infancy. The family lived at the Wormsloe Plantation in Savannah, Georgia, which De Renne inherited upon the death of his father in 1880. He rented the estate from the Pennsylvania Company for almost 25 years and had it running as a working farm.

He studied abroad, at Leipzig University and the University of Strasbourg, before graduating from Columbia Law School in 1876.

== Personal life ==
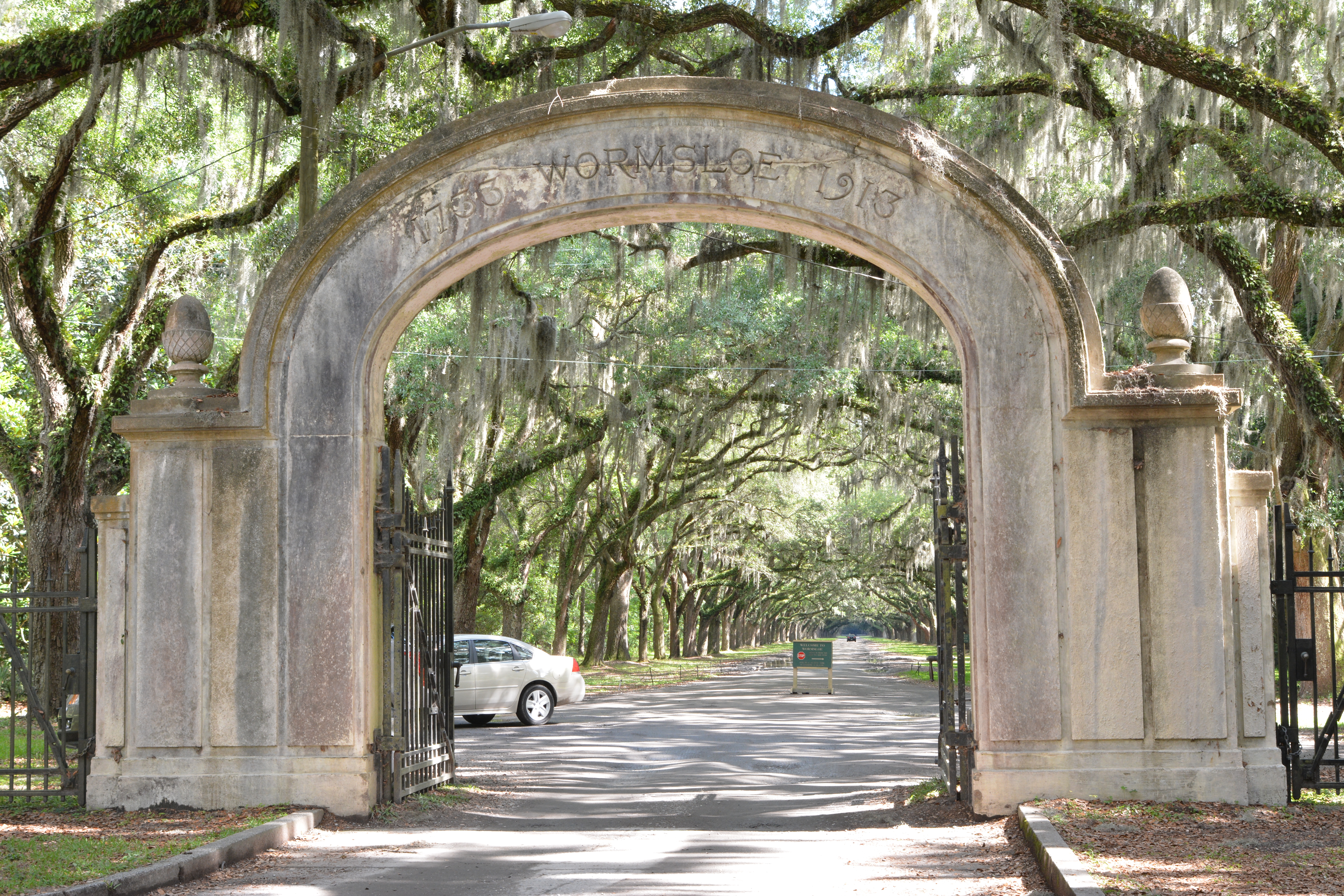
Entrance to Wormsloe

In 1880, De Renne married Laura Norris Camblos. It was his bride's second marriage, Laura's first husband—William Pepper Norris—having died in November 1876, a year into their marriage. She had one child with Norris: Charles Camblos Norris Jr., a physician, five months before being widowed.

De Renne and Camblos ran a cattle ranch in Texas and lived in Biarritz, France. They had three children—Elfrida Barrow, Audrey Coerr Howland and Wymberley Wormsloe— before returning to the Wormsloe Plantation in 1891. Wymberley Wormsloe was born in Biarritz, while Elfrida was born in Philadelphia. The birthplace of Audrey is not known.

After returning to Georgia, De Renne began collecting literature on the history of the state. He built a fireproof library―the Wymberley Jones De Renne Georgia Library)―in the grounds of the Wormsloe in 1907 and dedicated it to Noble Jones, the founder of the plantation. He produced seven publications, including two catalogs of his collection. He also printed two collections of manuscripts—the memoirs of Georgia governor Wilson Lumpkin in 1907 and, in 1915, letters of Confederate States Army general Robert E. Lee which had been previously unpublished—and published several collections of the Georgia Historical Society, of which his father had briefly been president. In addition to the library, De Renne was responsible for planting the Oak Avenue which Wormsloe is now famous for.

Among other societies, De Renne was a member of The Oglethorpe Club.

== Death ==
De Renne died in 1916, aged 62, while in New York City. He was interred in the family vault in Savannah's Colonial Park Cemetery. On May 18, 1880, De Renne's father had the remains of family members (including his grandfather, Noble Wimberly Jones) moved from Colonial Park Cemetery to a new family vault in Bonaventure Cemetery. De Renne's wife had preceded him in death by three years.
