= Wormsloe Quartos =

Works by George Wymberley Jones De Renne (1827–1880)

- Author: George Wymberley Jones De Renne
- Language: English
- Genre: History
- Publisher: Wormsloe Press
- Publication date: 1847–1886
- Publication place: United States
- Media type: Quarto

The Wormsloe Quartos were printed over six volumes between 1847 and 1886. The first four volumes were the direct work of historian George Wymberley Jones De Renne (1827–1880), who printed them at his press at Wormsloe Plantation near Savannah, Georgia. In the eyes of noted author Charles Colcock Jones Jr., the second, titled History of the Province of Georgia, was his most valuable. At the request of De Renne's widow, Mary, Jones edited the final two quartos, a compendium of unpublished colonial laws in Georgia (1881) and a journal of John James Perceval, 3rd Earl of Egmont (1886).

== Reviews ==
The quartos were noted for their "intrinsic value, admirable manufacture, and extreme rarity."

== List of Wormsloe's quartos ==
- Observations upon the Effects of Certain Late Political Suggestions (1847)
- History of the Province of Georgia, with Maps of Original Survey, by John Gerard William de Brahm, His Majesty's Surveyor General of the Southern District of North America (1849)
- Journal and Letters of Eliza Lucas (1850)
- Diary of Colonel Winthrop Sargent, Adjutant-General of the United States Army During the Campaign of 1791 (1851)
- Acts Passed by the General Assembly of the Colony of Georgia, 1755 to 1774 (1881)
- A Journal of the Transactions of the Trustees for Establishing the Colony of Georgia in America, by the Rt. Hon. John, Earl of Egmont (1886)
