= Edward Warren Young =

American architect

Edward Warren Young (1868–1926) was an American architect active in the late 19th and early 20th centuries.

== Career ==
In 1907, in partnership with Henrik Wallin (as Wallin and Young), he designed the De Renne Georgia Library on the Wormsloe Estate outside of Savannah, Georgia.

In 1915, Young dissolved his partnership with Wallin by mutual consent and opened his own practice in the newly constructed Savannah Bank and Trust Building in Johnson Square, Savannah, Georgia. The following year, he designed the two-story clubhouse of Savannah Golf Club, the oldest golf club in the United States.

In 1919, while working with Clinton and Russell, he helped design a 25-story clubhouse in Times Square for the National Council of Traveling Salesmen, at a cost of around $5 million. While working in New York, Young had offices at 30 Church Street.

== Personal life ==
Young was a member of the Phi Delta Theta fraternity. While on the payroll of Clinton and Russell, Young was living at 307 West 150th Street in Harlem, Manhattan.
