= Leonard Mackall =

American historian

- Born: Leonard Leopold Mackall; January 29, 1879; Baltimore, Maryland, U.S.
- Died: May 19, 1937 (aged 58); Fredericksburg, Virginia, U.S.
- Burial place: Bonaventure Cemetery, Savannah, Georgia, U.S.
- Occupations: Historian, biographer

Leonard Leopold Mackall (January 29, 1879 – May 19, 1937) was an American historian. He was an eminent biographer.

== Early life ==
Mackall was born in 1879 in Baltimore, Maryland, to Leonard Covington Mackall and Louisa Frederika Lawton. His father died when Leonard was eleven years old. He had one brother, Alexander Lawton, and one sister, Corinne.

He graduated from Lawrenceville School in Lawrenceville, New Jersey in 1896, before receiving a Bachelor of Arts degree from Johns Hopkins University in 1900. He graduated from Harvard Law School in 1902, then studied at the University of Berlin and the University of Jena.

== Career ==
In 1916, Mackall was tasked, by Wymberley Wormsloe De Renne, to fill in the spaces on the shelves of De Renne Georgia Library, established by De Renne on the family's Wormsloe Estate in Savannah, Georgia. Mackall worked on the project until the latter stages of World War I.

In 1920, he was elected to the Century Association, having been nominated by Robert Grier Monroe and Gari Melchers, Mackall's brother-in-law.

Mackall was president of the Bibliographical Society of America in 1936-1937. In 1937 he was president of the Georgia Historical Society.

He was also a member of Savannah's Oglethorpe Club.

== Death ==
Mackall died in 1937 at Mary Washington Hospital in Fredericksburg, Virginia, aged 58. He had been ill for several months. He was interred in Savannah's Bonaventure Cemetery.
