= Wymberley Wormsloe De Renne =

American preservationist (1891–1966)

- A sketch of De Renne
- Born: July 27, 1891; Biarritz, France
- Died: April 1, 1966 (aged 74); Savannah, Georgia, U.S.
- Resting place: Bonaventure Cemetery, Savannah, Georgia, U.S.
- Spouse: Augusta Gallie Floyd (1916–1966; his death)
- Parent(s): Wymberley Jones De Renne; Laura Norris De Renne

Wymberley Wormsloe De Renne (July 27, 1891 – April 1, 1966) was an American preservationist. He became a noted collector of literature on the history of the State of Georgia, continuing the work begun by his grandfather, George Wymberley Jones De Renne, and father, Wymberley Jones De Renne.

== Early life ==
De Renne was born in 1891 in Biarritz to Wymberley Jones De Renne and Laura Norris Camblos, during his parents' time in France.

== Career ==
After his father's death in 1916, De Renne made it his life's work to complete his father's library of Georgia history. He gave free rein to historian Leonard L. Mackall to fill in the spaces on the shelves of the De Renne Georgia Library on the family's Wormsloe Estate. Mackall worked on the project until the latter stages of World War I, after which De Renne enlisted the help of Azalea Hallett Clizbee of the American Art Association to catalog the library, which contained over 4,000 items. Further delays ensued, which led to De Renne's sisters, Audrey and Elfrida, underwriting the project. De Renne oversaw the project. The catalog was published, in three royal octavo volumes, by Plandome Press in 1931. The De Renne Georgia Library was sold to the Board of Regents of the University System of Georgia in 1938. De Renne worked on the library's staff until his retirement in 1956.

== Personal life ==
On March 9, 1918, De Renne married Augusta Gallie Floyd, with whom he had three children: Inigo Jones, Kentwyn Floyd and Eudora. During her husband's service in the war, for which he was stationed at Camp Wheeler, Augusta lived in Macon, Georgia.

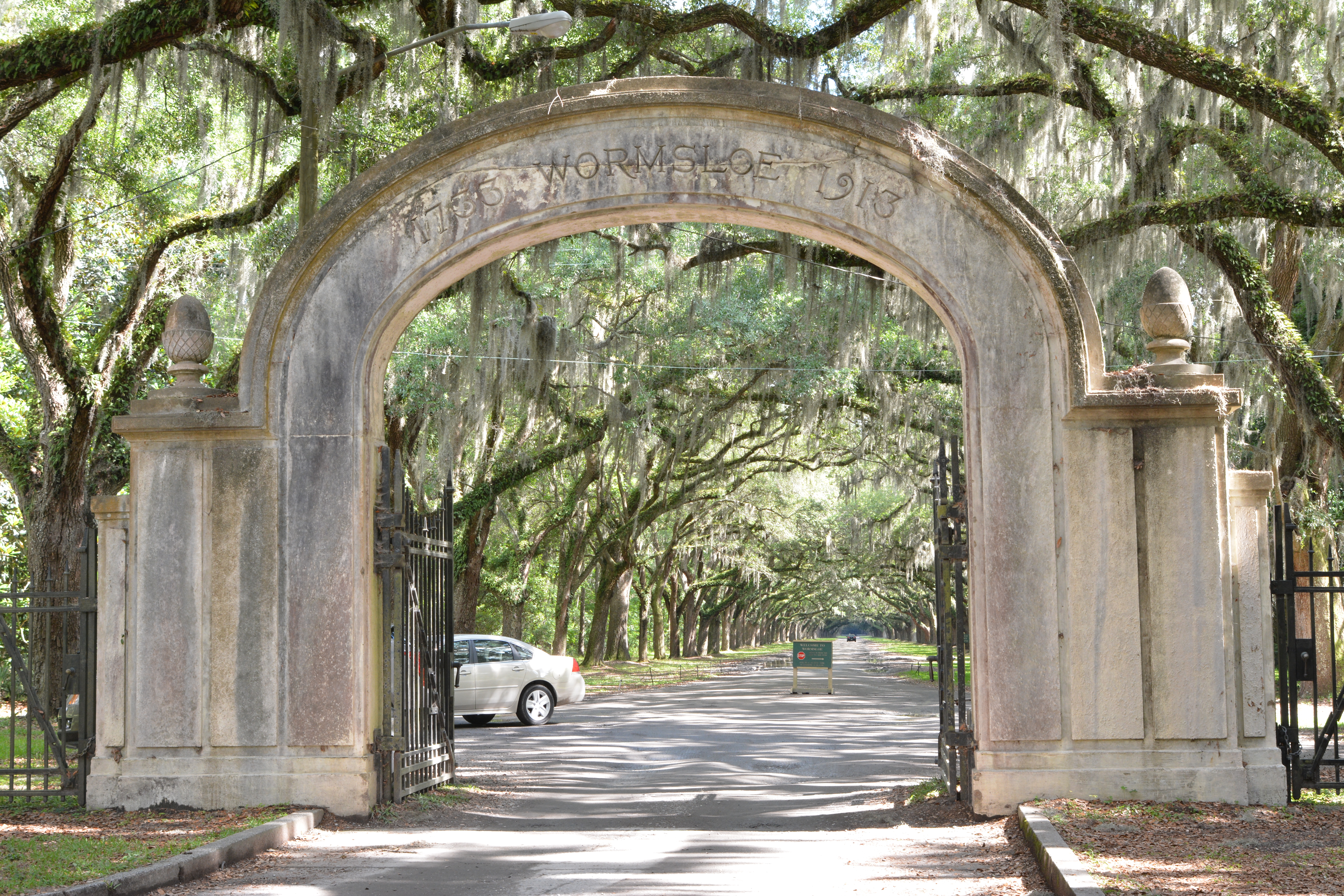
Entrance to Wormsloe

== Death ==
De Renne died in 1966, aged 74. He was interred in the family vault in Savannah's Bonaventure Cemetery. De Renne's widow survived him by three years.
