= Gracie Watson =

American folk figure (1882–1889)

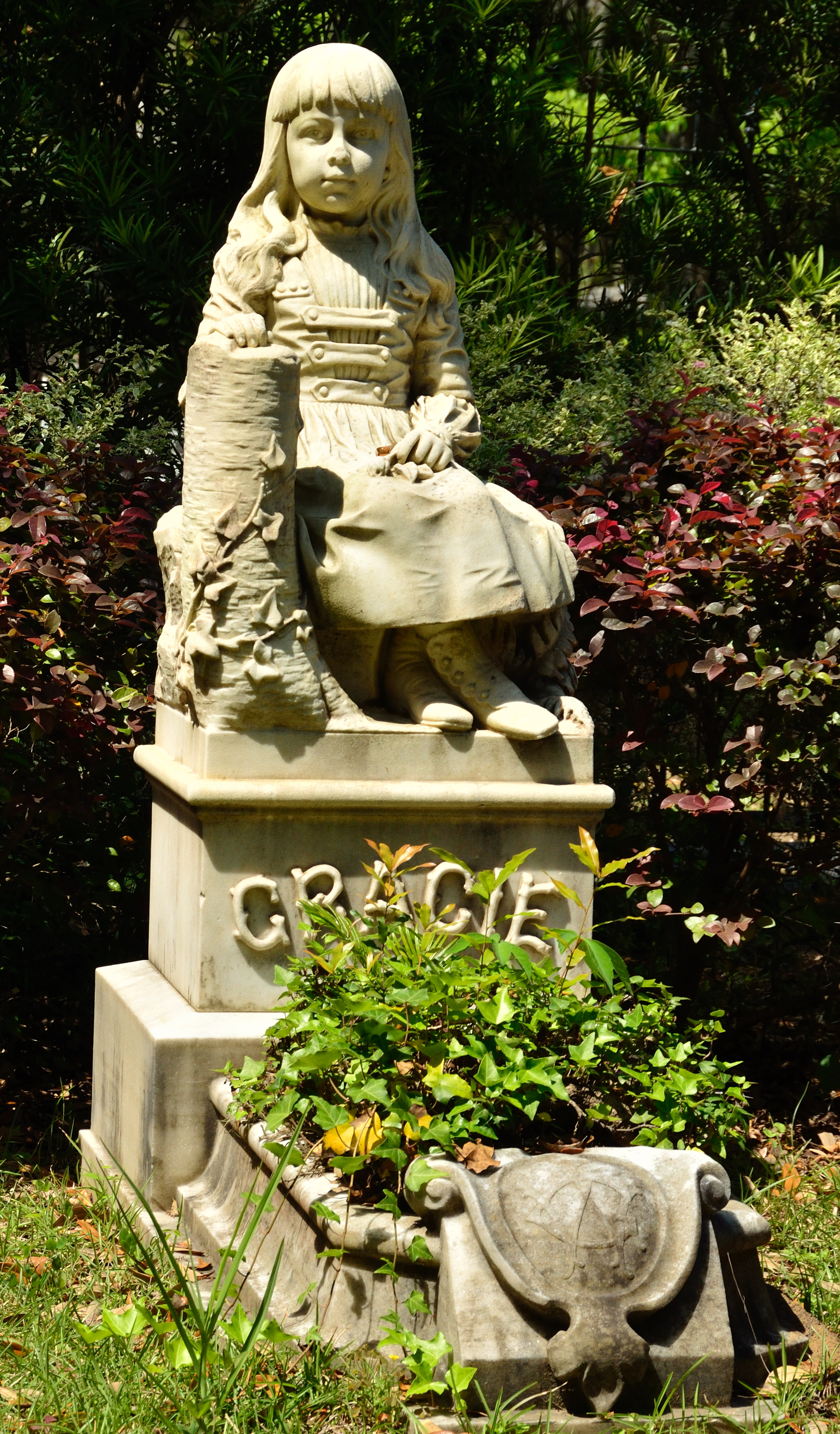
- The life-size sculpture of Gracie Watson at her gravesite in 2012
- Born: Gracie Perry Watson; July 10, 1882; Charleston County, South Carolina, U.S.
- Died: April 22, 1889 (aged 6); Savannah, Georgia, U.S.

Gracie Perry Watson (July 10, 1882 – April 22, 1889) was an American folk figure who became the subject of a notable statue by John Walz which has become a tourist attraction at Bonaventure Cemetery in Savannah, Georgia.

== Early life ==
Watson was born in 1882, the only child of W. J. Watson and Frances Waterman, who went on to run the now-demolished Pulaski House Hotel, which stood in Johnson Square in Savannah, Georgia, and was where Gracie grew up. They also ran the old DeSoto Hotel on Liberty Street. W. J. was also a city alderman between 1895 and 1897 and 1901 to 1903.

== Death ==
Watson died in 1889, aged six, from "blood poisoning superinduced by a severe attack of pneumonia," having fallen ill a few days after Easter. W. J. Watson commissioned a sculpture of his daughter from local artist John Walz, who created it from a photograph. The life-size marble sculpture, which was completed in 1890 and commonly referred to as Little Gracie Watson, was placed at her grave in Savannah's Bonaventure Cemetery. The monument is one of the only funerary monuments in Georgia sculpted in someone's exact likeness.

The grave became a tourist draw, which resulted in it being surrounded by a gated fence in 1999. The grave has been called "one of the most visited sites in Bonaventure Cemetery". Tours visit her grave to mark her birthday each year.

Her parents are buried elsewhere, having moved back to their native northeastern United States a few years later: her father in Fairview Cemetery in Wardsboro, Vermont, and her mother in Albany Rural Cemetery in Menands, New York.
