= Henrik Wallin =

Swedish-born American architect

Henrik Wallin (October 9, 1873 – January 28, 1936) was an architect active in Savannah, Georgia, in the late 19th and early 20th centuries. He was born in Rodviken, Nordmaling, Sweden.

In 1915, the architectural firm of Wallin and Young was dissolved. Wallin continued alone at 23 Abercorn Street, today's Olde Pink House, in Savannah, while Edward Warren Young opened a practice in the Savannah Bank and Trust Building in Johnson Square.

He designed some works that are included on the National Register of Historic Places within historic districts. These include:

- De Renne Georgia Library, Isle of Hope, Georgia (1907; with Edward Warren Young)
- YMCA Building, Savannah, Georgia (1910)
- Wallin Hall, at Savannah College of Art & Design (1912, with Edward Warren Young)
- 37th Street School (1913)
- Armstrong House, Savannah, Georgia (c.1917)
- DeRenne Apartments (1919), now DeRenne Plaza Condominiums, 24 E Liberty Street
- George Ferguson & Lucy Camp Armstrong House, 447 Bull Street
- City High School (1920, with others)
- Edmund H. Abrahams House, 518 E. Victory Dr. (1922)
- First Baptist Church (1922 renovation of 1833 church), 223 Bull Street
- The Glynn Academy Building (1923)
- General Oglethorpe Hotel, Wilmington Island, Georgia (1924)
- YMCA Building (1925)
- Realty Building (1925)
- Charles Willis School (1928, with others)
- Florence Street School (1929, with others)
- Armstrong Junior College Auditorium (c.1935)
- One or more works in Ardsley Park-Chatham Crescent Historic District, Savannah, Georgia
- One or more works on Ossabaw Island, 7 mi. S of Savannah, bounded by the Atlantic Ocean, Bear R., Ogeechee R., and St. Catherine's Sound
- One or more works in Thomas Square Streetcar Historic District, roughly bounded by Anderson Ln., 42nd St., Victory Dr., E. Broad St., and Martin Luther King Jr. Blvd. Savannah

== See also ==
- National Register of Historic Places listings in Chatham County, Georgia
