= George Wymberley Jones De Renne =

American philanthropist (1827–1880)

- De Renne pictured around 1870
- Born: George Frederick Tilghman Jones; July 19, 1827; Philadelphia, Pennsylvania, U.S.
- Died: August 4, 1880 (aged 53); Philadelphia, Pennsylvania, U.S.
- Resting place: Bonaventure Cemetery, Savannah, Georgia, U.S.
- Spouse: Mary Wallace Nuttall (1851–1880; his death)
- Children: 4, including Wymberley Jones De Renne

George Wymberley Jones De Renne (born George Frederick Tilghman Jones; July 19, 1827 – August 4, 1880) was an American planter, bibliophile and philanthropist. He was, for a period of his life, the wealthiest citizen of Savannah, Georgia. He collected over 1,300 volumes of the history of the State of Georgia.

== Early life ==
De Renne was born in Philadelphia, Pennsylvania, in 1827 to physician George Jones and Eliza Smith, his father's third wife. His last name is a corruption of his maternal grandmother's maiden name, Van Deren.

During De Renne's formative years, his family moved to Savannah, Georgia, but in late 1838 or early 1839, after the death of his father, De Renne and his widowed mother returned to Philadelphia. He studied at the University of Pennsylvania Medical School under the tutelage of Dr. Samuel Jackson. De Renne's thesis, titled Theory Concerning the Nature of Insanity, was published privately in 1847, with 48 copies specially distributed. He graduated with a PhD. His maternal grandfather, Justice Thomas Smith, was a prominent lawyer and judge in Philadelphia.

== Personal life ==
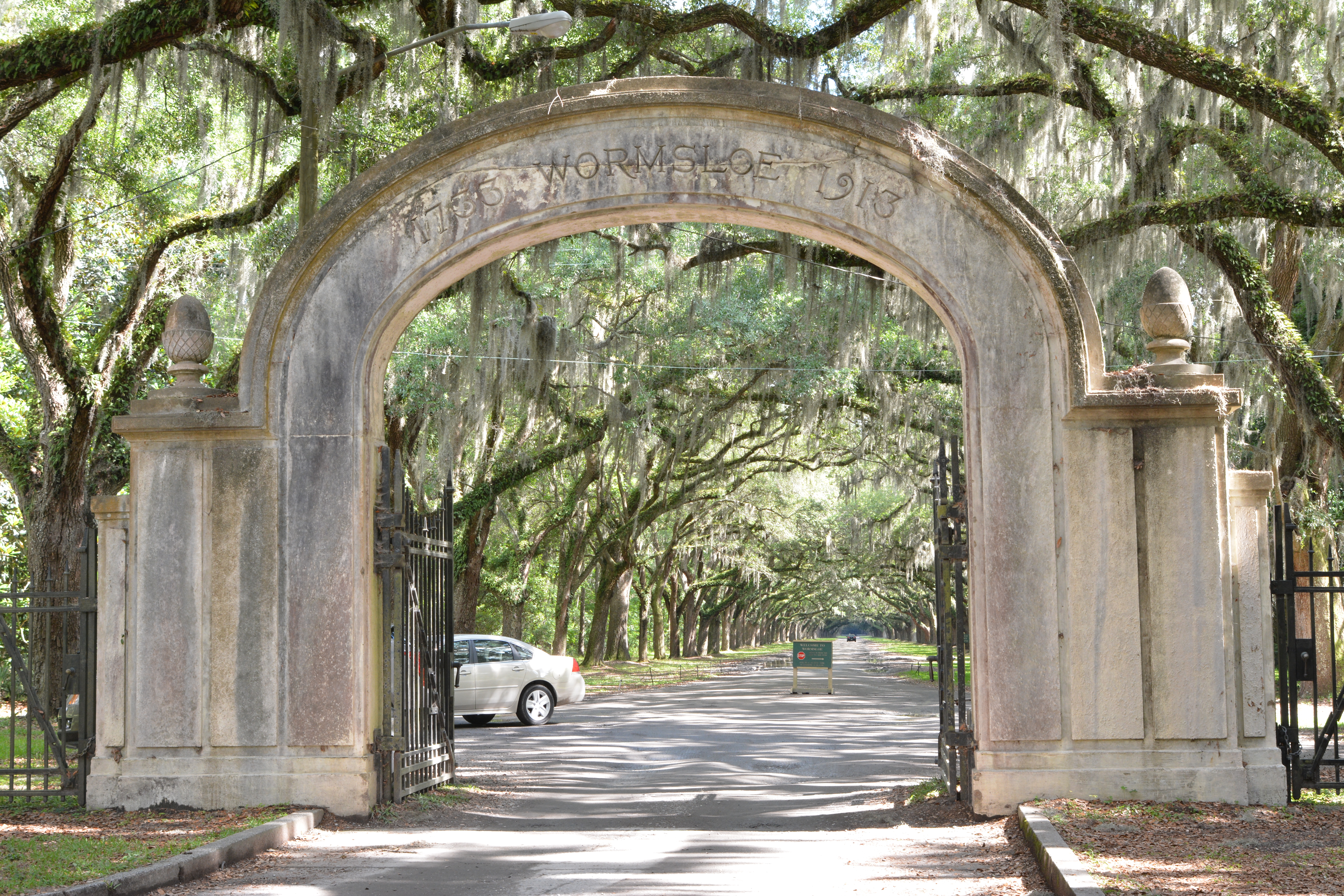
Entrance to Wormsloe

De Renne changed his name from George Frederick Tilghman Jones in 1866 because the number of George Joneses in his family was causing incorrect mail delivery and the like. After moving to Savannah, he became custodian of the Wormsloe Plantation, which was established by his great-grandfather, English colonist Noble Jones, in 1739.

In 1847, he reprinted from the Wormsloe press the "rare and valuable" political book by George Walton, William Few and Richard Howley, titled Observations Upon the Effects of Certain Late Political Suggestions of the Delegates of Georgia. Two years later, he printed Observations on Dr. Stevens' History of Georgia, a "caustic" review of the original publication. The same year, he issued History of the Province of Georgia, with Maps of Original Survey, by John Gerard William de Brahm, His Majesty's Surveyor General of the Southern District of North America. The second of his four Wormsloe Quartos, this was considered De Renne's most valuable publication in the eyes of Charles Colcock Jones Jr.

In 1851, De Renne married Mary Wallace Nuthall (or Nuttall). They had four children, each of whom (but especially son Wymberley Jones De Renne) continued their father's legacy of maintaining and printing collections of Georgia's history. He was also a philanthropist, including donating a building on Savannah's West Broad Street as a "colored school". George's grandson, Wymberley Wormsloe De Renne, completed what his father had not prior to his death in 1916. Wymberley Wormsloe De Renne's sister, Elfrida De Renne Barrow, was also instrumental in preserving the history of Georgia. Everard, another son, inherited his parents' collections upon Mary's death in 1887.

At the outbreak of the American Civil War, in 1861, De Renne relocated from Wormsloe to downtown Savannah due to potential invasions from the Georgia coastline.

He was a member of the Georgia Historical Society, and was briefly its president.

== Death ==
On May 18, 1880, De Renne had the remains of family members (including his grandfather, Noble Wimberly Jones) contained in a brick vault at Savannah's Colonial Park Cemetery moved to a new family vault in Bonaventure Cemetery.

De Renne died three months later, aged 53. He was initially interred in a vault in Philadelphia but was removed a short time later to Bonaventure. During the year following his death, De Renne's widow asked Charles Colcock Jones Jr. to edit her husband's fifth quarto, a compendium of unpublished colonial laws in Georgia. A sixth quarto, a journal of John James Perceval, 3rd Earl of Egmont, followed in 1886, also edited by Jones.

== Bibliography ==
The four quartos published during De Renne's lifetime:

- Observations upon the Effects of Certain Late Political Suggestions (1847)
- History of the Province of Georgia (1849)
- Journal and Letters of Eliza Lucas (1850)
- Diary of Colonel Winthrop Sargent, Adjutant-General of the United States Army During the Campaign of 1791 (1851)
