= Jack Leigh =

American photographer and author

- Jack Leigh's portrait from his book Nets & Doors: Shrimping in Southern Waters
- Born: November 8, 1948; Savannah, Georgia, U.S.
- Died: May 19, 2004 (aged 55); Savannah, Georgia, U.S.
- Resting place: Bonaventure Cemetery, Savannah, Georgia, U.S.
- Known for: Photography

John David Leigh II (November 8, 1948 – May 19, 2004) was an American photographer and author, known for the cover photograph on John Berendt's novel Midnight in the Garden of Good and Evil. The photograph featured the Bird Girl statue from Bonaventure Cemetery in Savannah, Georgia, where he is now buried.

Leigh was a native of Savannah, and a graduate of the Savannah Country Day School and the University of Georgia. Already well known locally as a portrait and documentary photographer, Leigh was commissioned by Random House for the photograph. Leigh wrote and published five books on photography. His former photo gallery was a popular tourist attraction in the historic district of downtown Savannah.

Leigh died in 2004 in Savannah, of colon cancer. He was 55.

== Published works ==
- Oystering: A Way of Life (ISBN 0910326177 with James Dickey and Charles L. Wyrick, Jr.; Carolina Art Association, June 1983)
- Nets & Doors: Shrimping in Southern Waters (ISBN 0941711129, Gibbs Smith Publishing, October 1, 1989)
- Seaport: A Waterfront at Work (ISBN 094171134X, Gibbs Smith Publishing, July 1, 1996)
- The Land I'm Bound To Photographs (ISBN 978-0-393-04931-2, with Pat Conroy; W.W. Norton & Company, Sept 2000)
- The Ogeechee: A River and Its People (ISBN 082032650X, Wormsloe Foundation Publications, April 28, 2004)
- Ossabaw: Evocations of an Island (ISBN 0820326429, with James Kilgo, Alan Campbell, and John Lane; University of Georgia Press, April 28, 2004)
