= Bonaventure Cemetery =

Burial ground in Savannah, Georgia

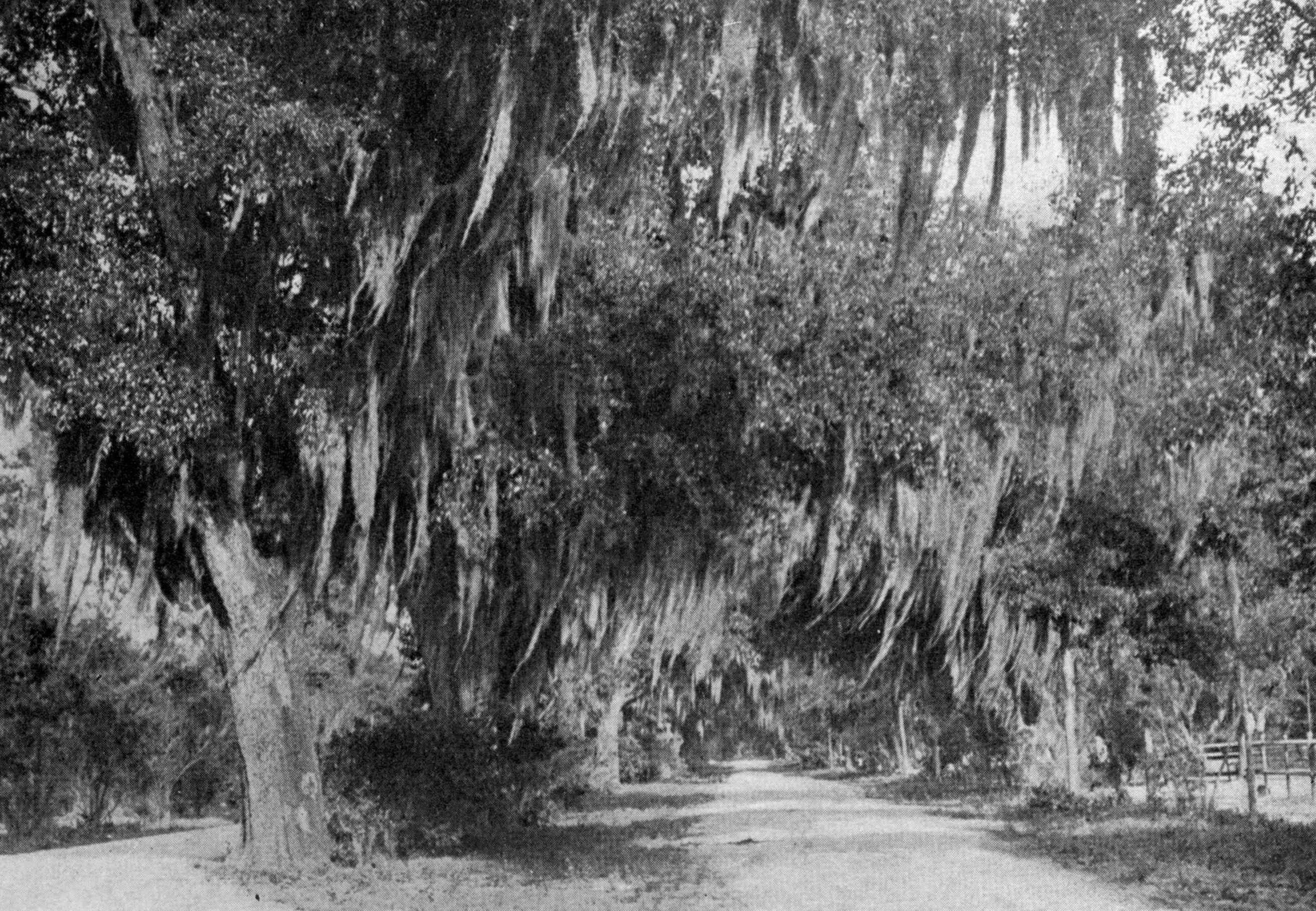
- The cemetery depicted in John Muir's book A Thousand-Mile Walk to the Gulf (1916)
- Interactive map of Bonaventure Cemetery

Details
- Established: 1846
- Location: 330 Bonaventure Road; Savannah, Georgia, United States
- Coordinates: 32°2′38″N 81°2′44″W
- Type: Public municipal
- Owned by: City of Savannah
- Size: 160-acre (647,000 m^{2})
- Bonaventure Cemetery
- U.S. National Register of Historic Places
- U.S. Historic district
- Location within Georgia Location within the United States
- Architects: Urban, Henry; et al.
- NRHP reference No.: 01000035
- Added to NRHP: February 2, 2001

Bonaventure Cemetery is a rural cemetery located on a scenic bluff of the Wilmington River, southeast of downtown Savannah, Georgia. The cemetery's prominence grew when it was featured in the 1994 novel Midnight in the Garden of Good and Evil by John Berendt, and in the subsequent movie, directed by Clint Eastwood, based on the book. It is the largest of the city's municipal cemeteries, containing nearly 160 acres (0.65 km^{2}).

The entrance to the cemetery is located at 330 Bonaventure Road. Immediately inside the gates is the large and ornate Gaston Tomb, built in memory of William Gaston, a prominent merchant.

== History ==
The cemetery is located on the former site of Bonaventure Plantation, originally owned by Colonel John Mullryne. On March 10, 1846, Commodore Josiah Tattnall III sold the 600-acre (2.4 km^{2}) plantation and its private cemetery to Peter Wiltberger. The first burials took place in 1850, and three years later, Peter Wiltberger himself was entombed in a family vault.

Major William H. Wiltberger, the son of Peter, formed the Evergreen Cemetery Company on June 12, 1868. On July 7, 1907, the City of Savannah purchased the Evergreen Cemetery Company, making the cemetery public and changing the name to Bonaventure Cemetery.

In 1867, John Muir began his Thousand-Mile Walk to Florida and the Gulf. In October, he sojourned for six days and nights in the cemetery, sleeping upon graves overnight, this being the safest and cheapest accommodation that he could find while he waited for money to be expressed from home. He found the cemetery breathtakingly beautiful and inspiring and wrote a lengthy chapter upon it, "Camping in the Tombs".

Greenwich Cemetery became an addition to Bonaventure in 1933.

== Operations ==
Citizens of Savannah and others may purchase interment rights in Bonaventure.

The cemetery is open to the public daily from 8:00 a.m. to 5:00 p.m. There is no admission fee.

Adjacent to Bonaventure Cemetery is the privately owned and newer Forest Lawn Cemetery and Columbarium.

== Department of Cemeteries ==
The main office of the City of Savannah's Department of Cemeteries is located on the Bonaventure Cemetery grounds in the Bonaventure Administrative Building at the entrance.

== Bonaventure Historical Society ==
The cemetery became the subject of a non-profit group, the Bonaventure Historical Society, in May 1997. The group has compiled an index of the burials at the cemetery.

== Bird Girl ==
The cover photograph for the best-selling book Midnight in the Garden of Good and Evil, taken by Jack Leigh, featured an evocative sculpture of a young girl, the so-called Bird Girl, that had been in the cemetery, essentially unnoticed, for over 50 years. After the publication of the book, the sculpture was relocated from the cemetery in 1997 for display in Telfair Museums in Savannah. In late 2014, the statue was moved to a dedicated space in the Telfair Museums' Jepson Center for the Arts on West York Street, in Savannah.

== Notable burials ==
- Samuel B. Adams, interim Justice of the Supreme Court of Georgia
- Leopold Adler, department store owner
- Conrad Aiken, novelist and poet
- Robert Houstoun Anderson (1835–1888), 2nd Lieutenant US Army, General CSA Army, Chief of Police City of Savannah
- Middleton Barnwell, bishop
- Edythe Chapman, actress
- Nicholas Bayard Clinch (1832–1888), military officer
- Hugh Comer (1842–1900), president of the Georgia Central Railway
- George Wymberley Jones De Renne (1827–1880), philanthropist and preservationist
- Mary Nuttall De Renne (1835–1887), wife of Georgia
- Wymberley Jones De Renne (1853–1916), son of George and Mary
- Wymberley Wormsloe De Renne (1891–1966), son of Wymberley
- William B. Hodgson (1801–1871), diplomat and scholar. Although he arranged with (and paid) William H. Wiltberger for burial lot 13 of section D, he was interred in lot 19 of the same section. The family of Noble Jones, including his son Noble Wimberly Jones, occupies lot 13.
- Anna Colquitt Hunter (1892–1985), co-founder of Historic Savannah Foundation
- Noble Wimberly Jones (c. 1723–1805), physician and statesman
- Jack Leigh, photographer, author
- Leonard Mackall (1879–1937), historian
- Hugh W. Mercer, Civil War Army officer and Confederate general
- Johnny Mercer, singer/songwriter and great-grandson of Hugh W. Mercer
- James Neill, actor
- Edward Padelford (1799–1870), businessman for whom Savannah's Padelford Ward is named
- Marie Louise Scudder Myrick (1854–1934), First Female Owner, Editor, Publisher of a Southern US Newspaper (1895), The Americus Times-Recorder
- Sonny Seiler (1933–2023), attorney
- John Stoddard, president of the Georgia Historical Society and the first president of Evergreen Cemetery Company
- Josiah Tattnall Jr. (1765–1803), Senator, General, and Georgia Governor
- Josiah Tattnall III (1795–1871), Commodore USN, Captain CSA Navy
- Edward Telfair, governor
- Mary Telfair, philanthropist and art collector, daughter of Edward
- George Tiedeman, mayor of Savannah
- F. Bland Tucker, Episcopal minister and hymn writer
- John Walz (1844–1922), sculptor
- Gracie Watson, famous statue at her gravesite, 6 years old
- Claudius Charles Wilson (1831–1863), Civil War Confederate brigadier General
- Rosa Louise Woodberry (1869–1932), journalist, educator
- Bartholomew Zouberbuhler (1719–1766), early Presbyterian minister
- Spanish–American War veterans from Worth Bagley Camp #10 in Section K. It is the nation's second-largest area dedicated to those killed in that conflict

== Gallery ==
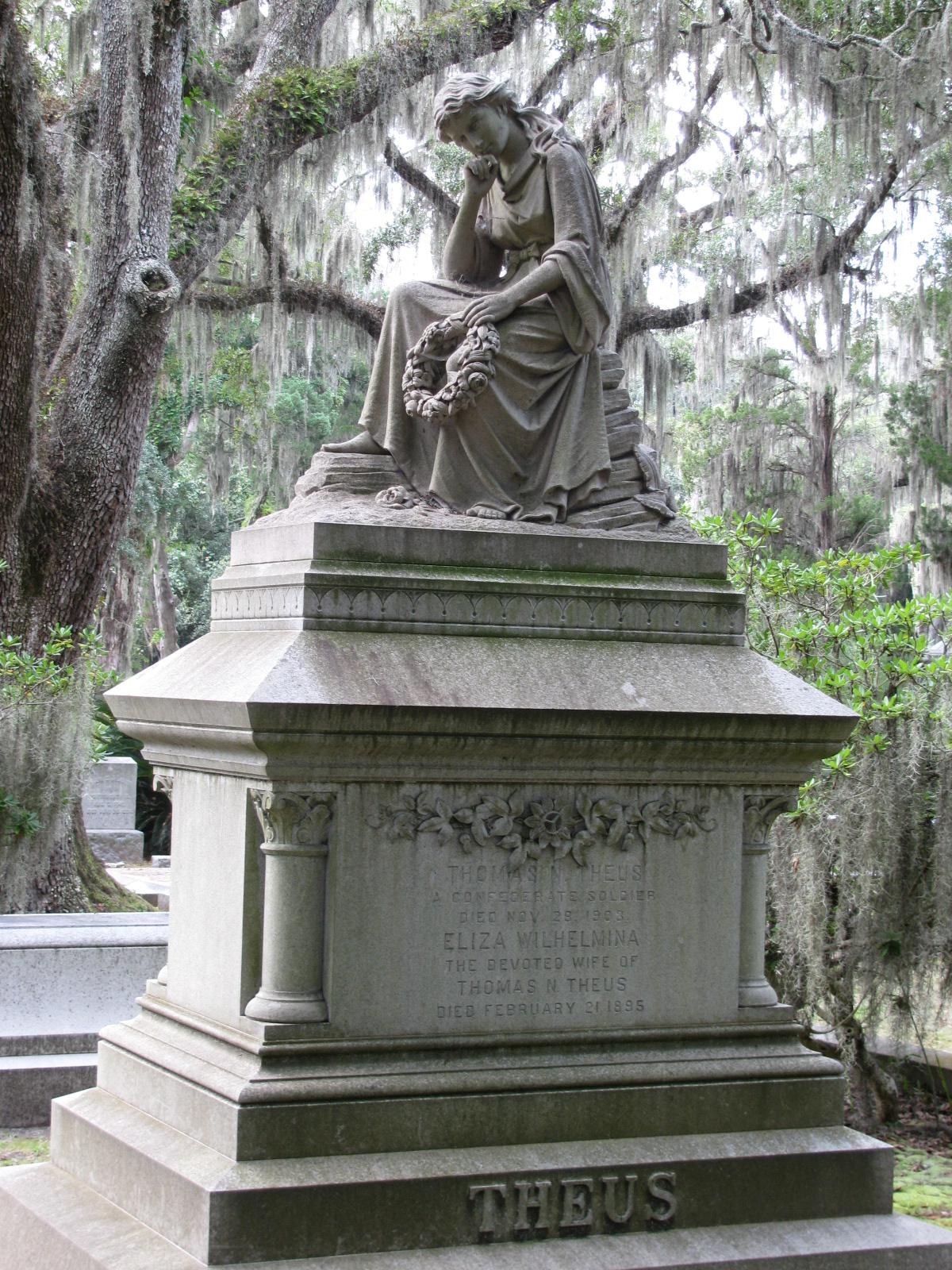
Theus tomb

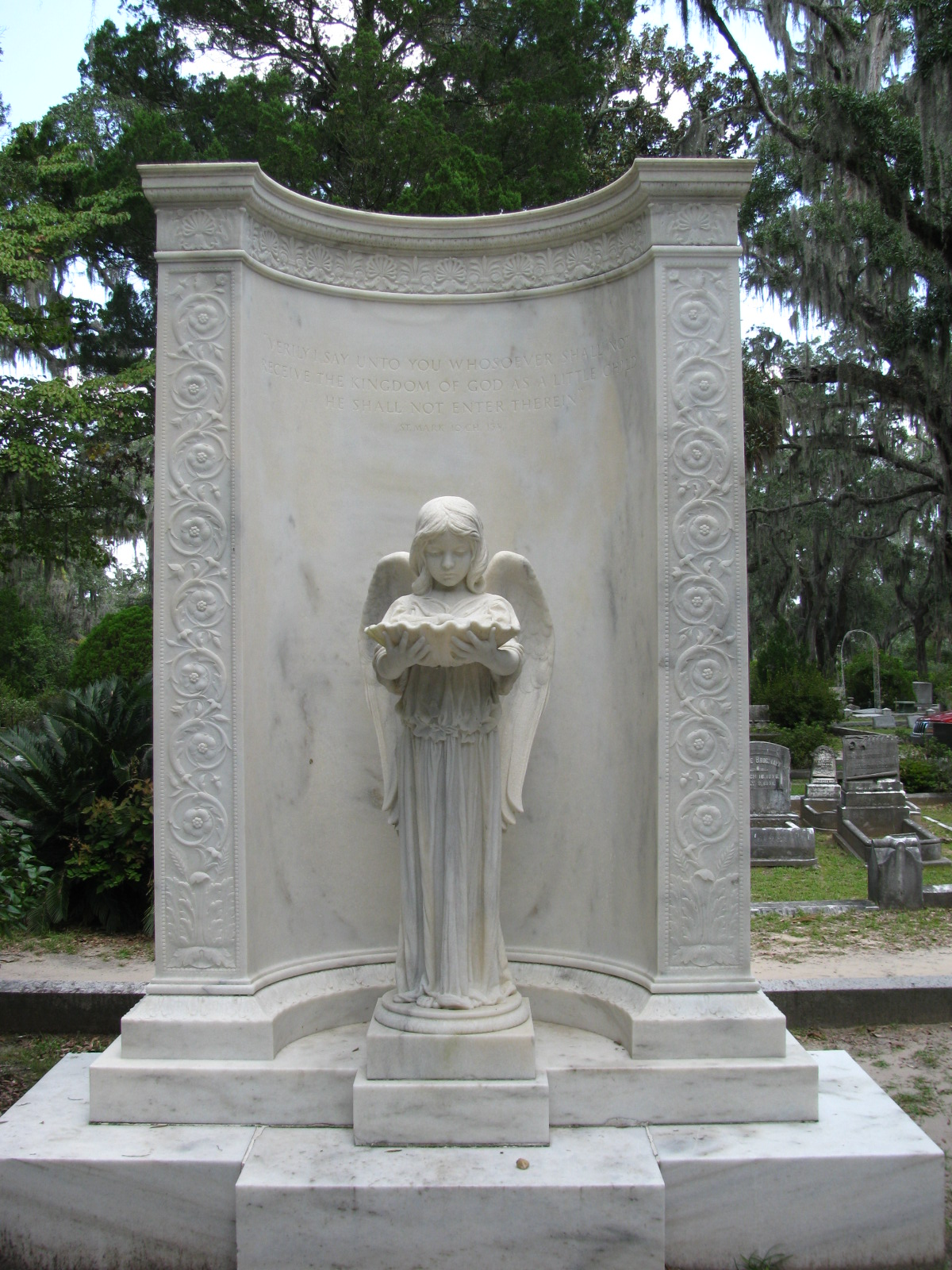
Baldwin tomb

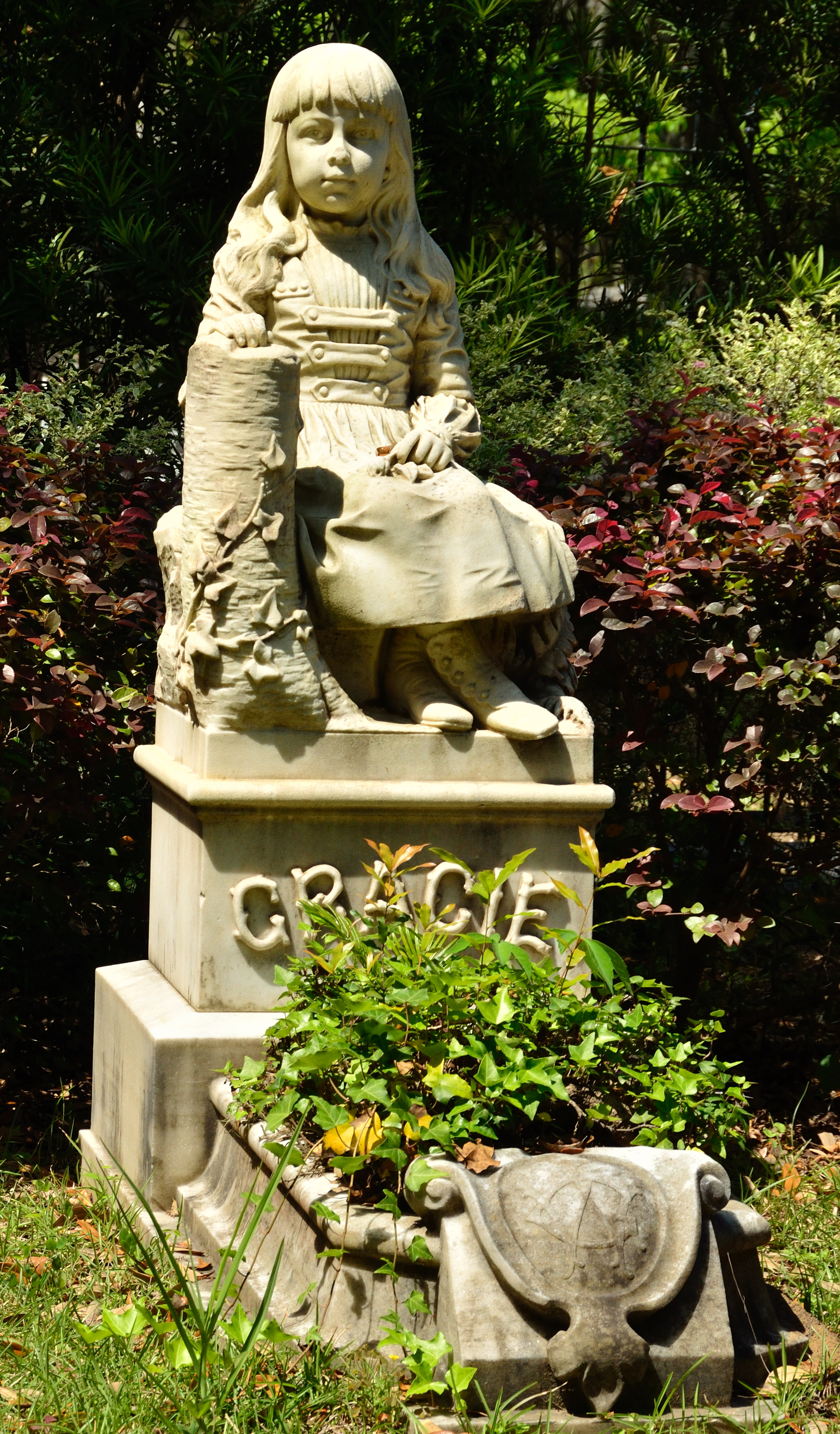
"Gracie"

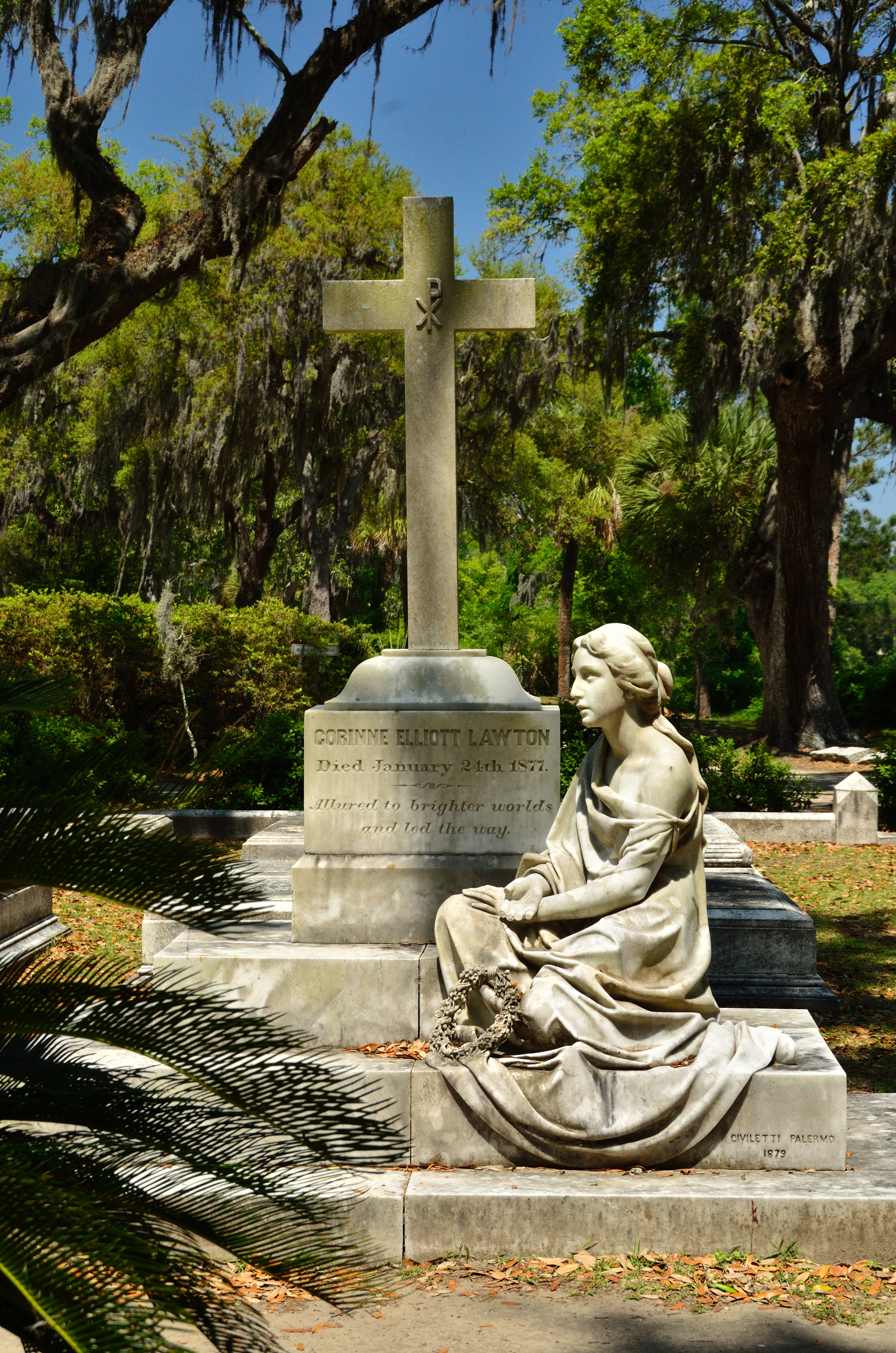
Lawton grave

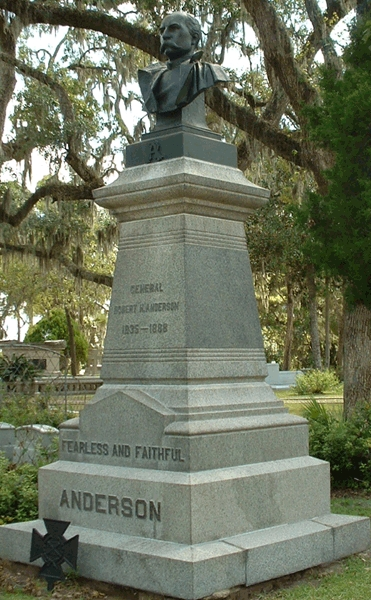
R H Anderson

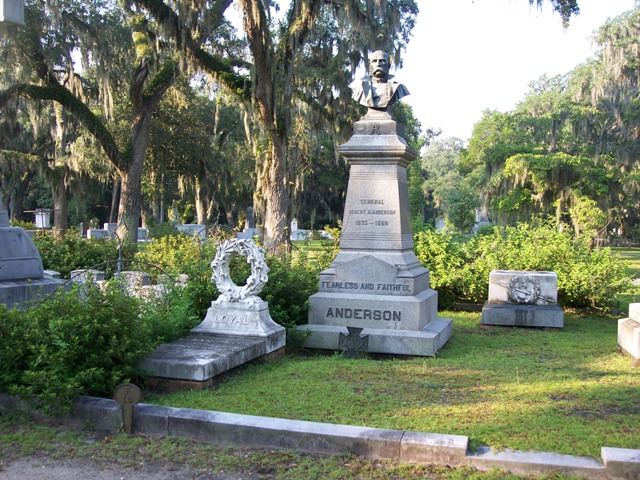
Anderson Family Gravesite

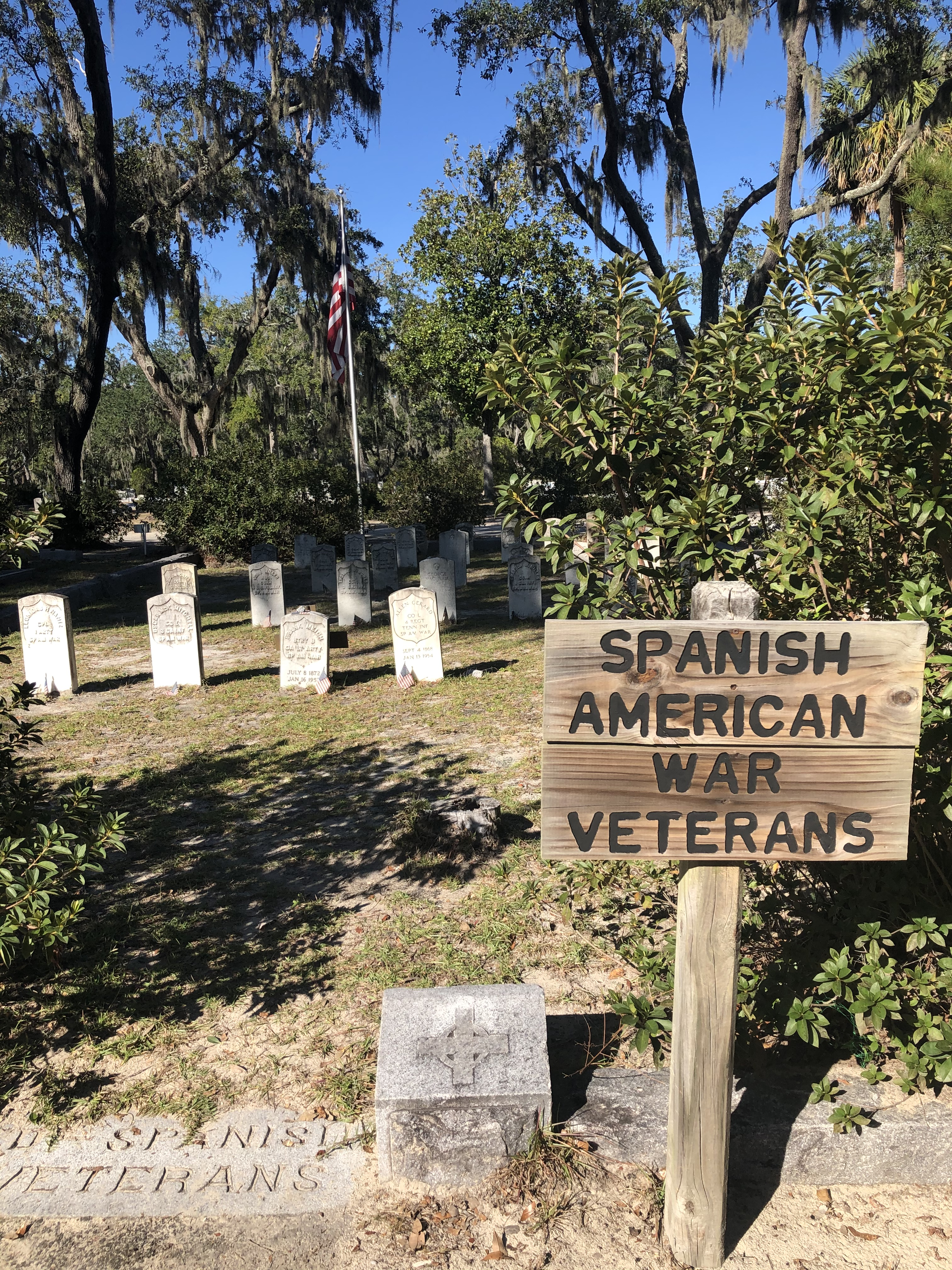
Spanish-American War Veterans

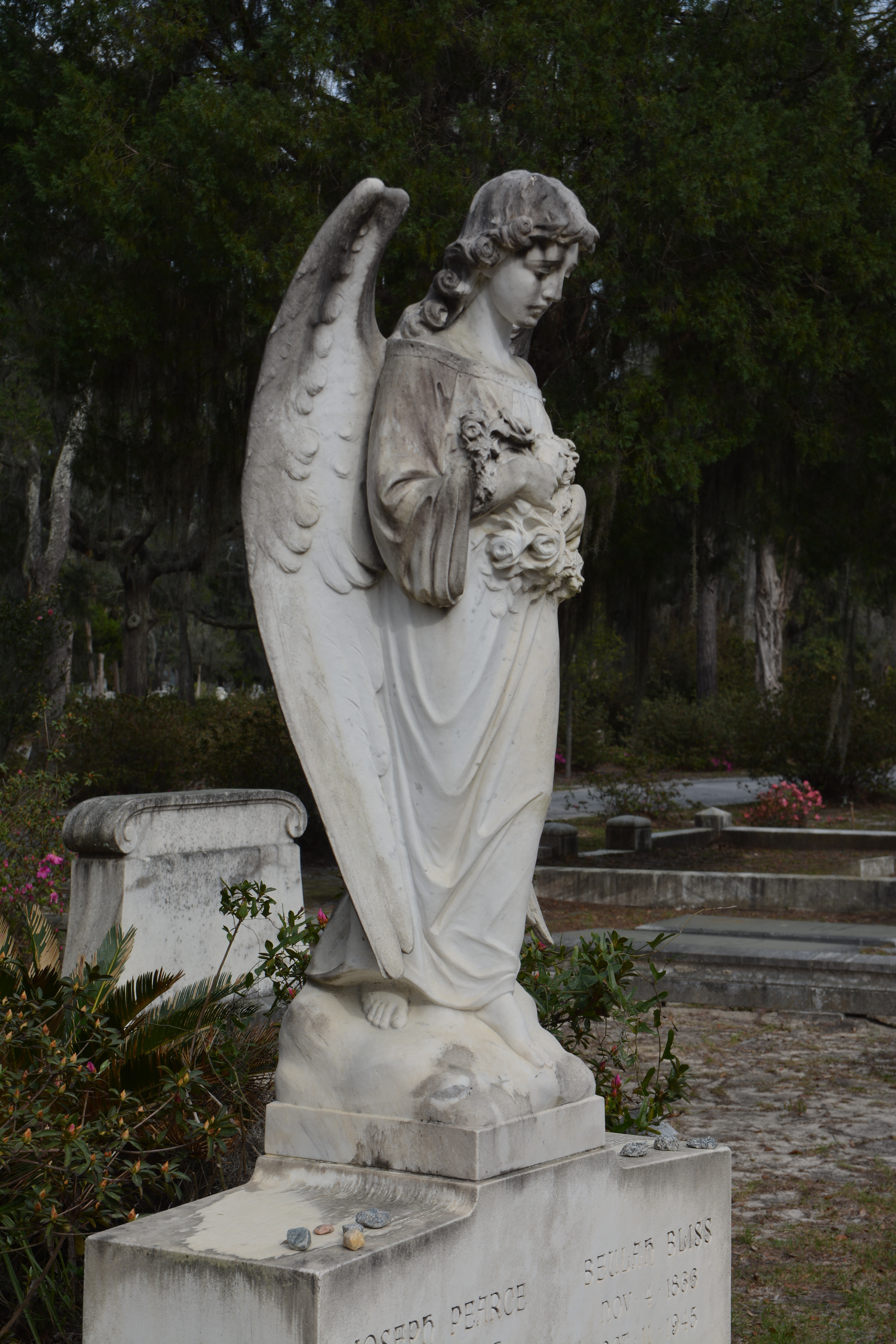
Statue

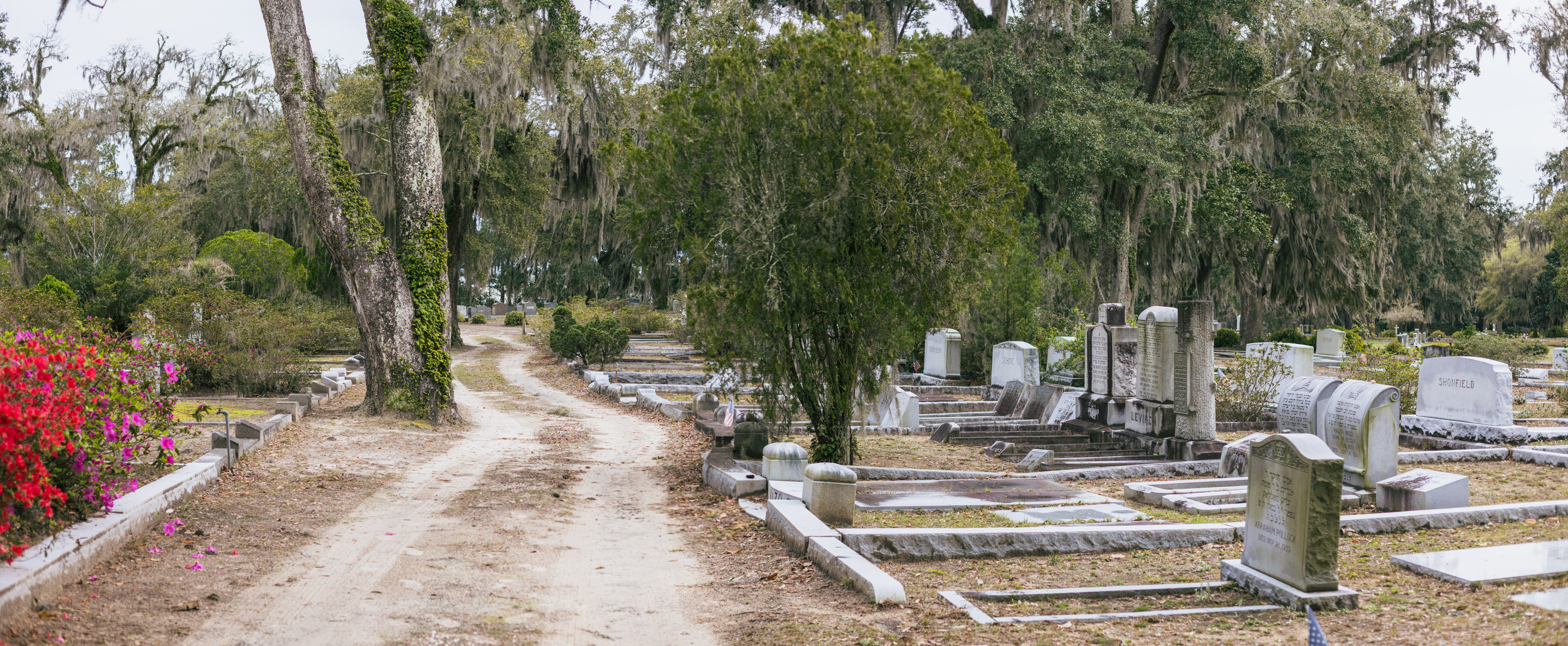
A panorama of the cemetery

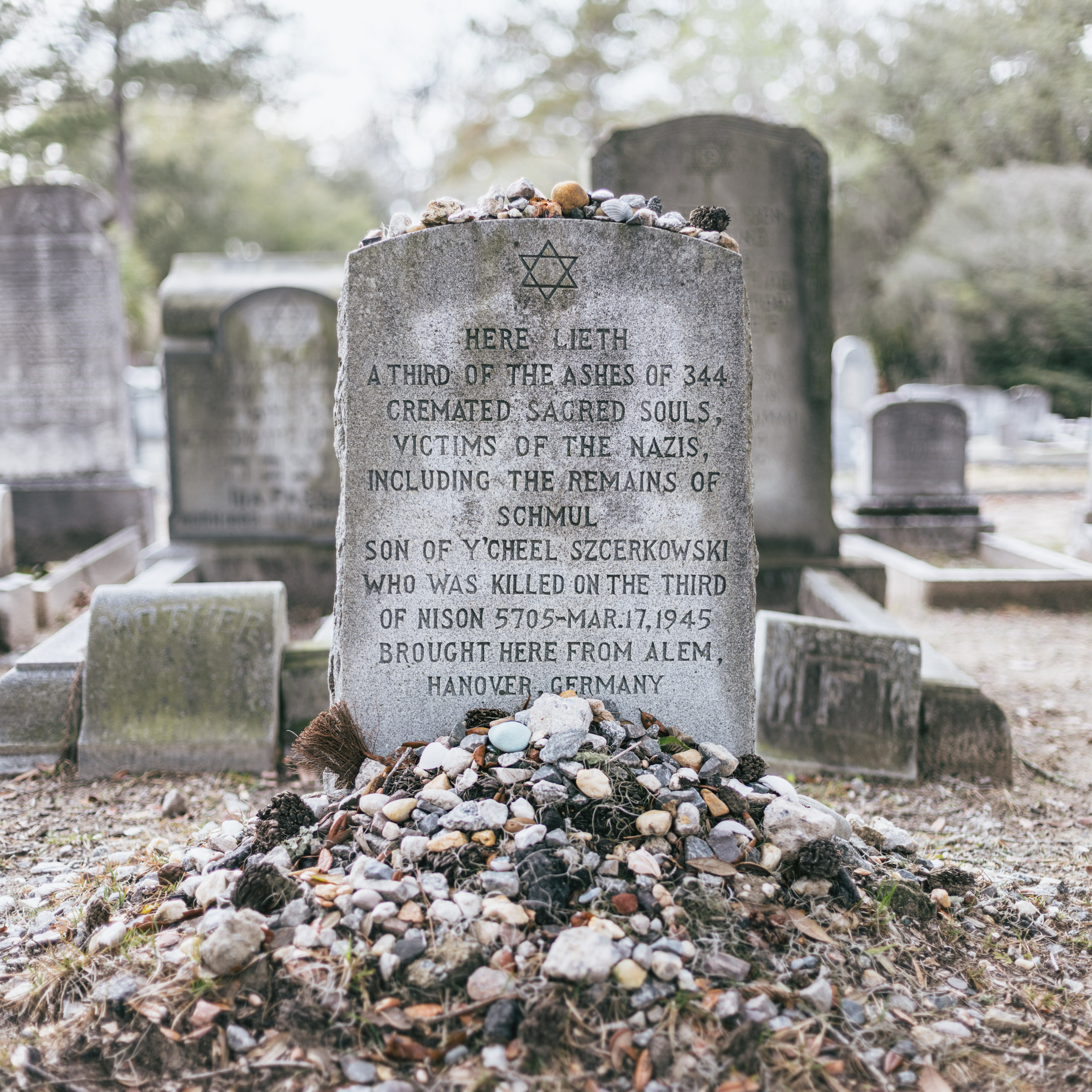
The holocaust memorial near Jewish Circle

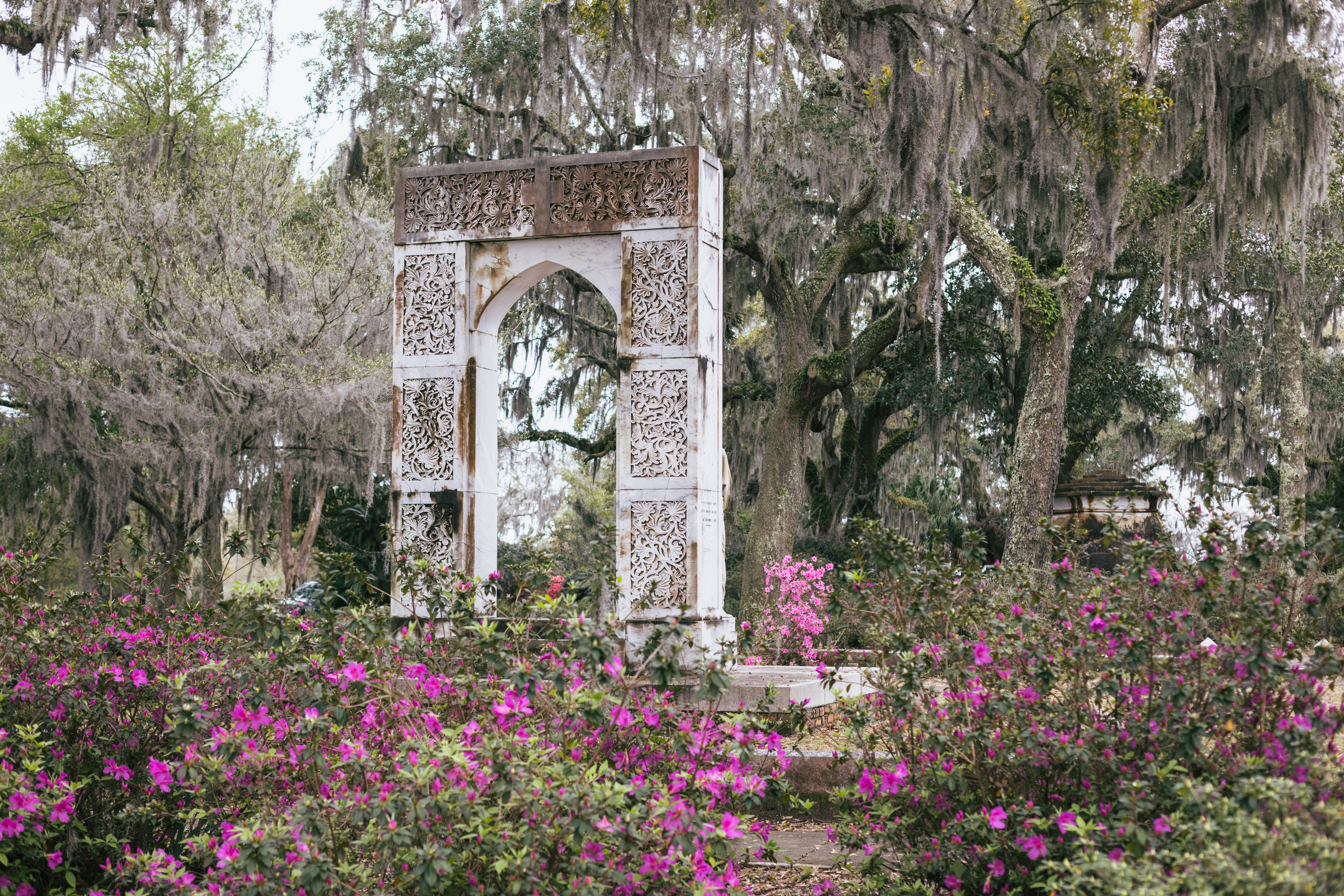
The monument standing over the family plot of Alexander R. Lawton
