= Alexander Lawton Mackall =

American journalist

- Born: May 23, 1888 Chestnut Hill, Philadelphia, U.S.
- Died: March 26, 1968 (aged 79) West New Brighton, Staten Island, New York, U.S.
- Occupation: Author, journalist, gastronomy expert and critic
- Notable works: Knife and Fork in New York, A Perfect Fool, Bizarre, Portugal for Two
- Notable awards: Ordem de Cristo (Portugal)

Alexander Lawton Mackall (May 23, 1888 – March 26, 1968) was an author, journalist and gastronomy expert and critic.

He was the editor of several New York City magazines and the author of the renowned restaurant guide Knife and Fork in New York (1948), a precursor of the Zagat's Survey. He had a strong connection to the Portuguese culture, being made an official of the Ordem de Cristo, a Portuguese honorific order that distinguishes personalities in the field of culture. Through The Lawton Mackall Foundation, incorporated in New York, he instituted a monetary prize to be awarded to the best students of a selected set of high schools in Portugal.

Mackall was the brother of historian Leonard Mackall and painter Corinne Melchers.

== Main works ==
- A Perfect Fool, Everybody's Magazine, August 1925
- Bizarre (illustrated by Lauren Stout), Lieber & Lewis, New York, 1922.
- Black Jitney, The Century, March 1916
- Broadway's Poet Laureate, Everybody's Magazine, Janeiro 1926
- Clair de Loony, Zest, Janeiro 1927
- Hum and Grow Rich, Colliers, June 20, 1925
- Knife and Fork in New York, Doubleday, New York, 1949;
- Light Breakfast, The Century, April 1916
- Poodle Oodle of Doodle Farm (with Ruth Mackall);
- Portugal for Two, 1931;
- Scrambled Eggs, Stewart & Kidd Company, Cincinnati, 1920;
- Scrambled Eggs, The Smart Set, June 1915
- The Creeping Fingers, The Century, October 1915
- The Man with the Hose, The Century, September 1915
- The Night of the Fleece, The Century, August 1915
- The Restaurateur's Handbook (with Charles A. Faissole), 1938.
