= Thomas Smith (Pennsylvania judge) =

American judge

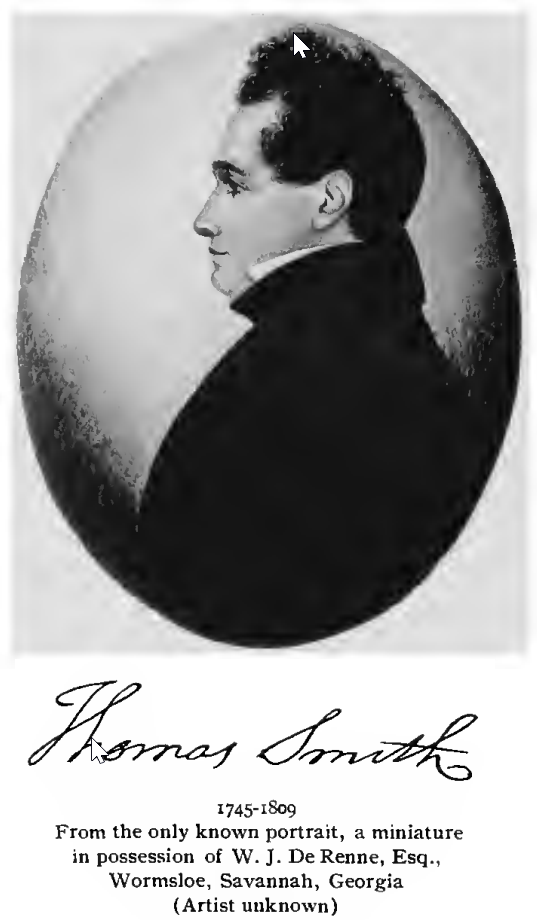

Thomas Smith (1745 – March 31, 1809) was a politician and jurist from Pennsylvania.

== Formative years ==
Born near Cruden, Aberdeenshire, Scotland in 1745, Smith attended the University of Edinburgh, and then immigrated to the United States, where he settled in Bedford, Pennsylvania on February 9, 1769. He became a deputy surveyor that same year. Smith then studied law, was admitted to the bar, and began practicing as a lawyer in 1772.

== Career ==
In 1773, Smith became a deputy register of wills and prothonotary, and a justice of the peace in 1774.

When the Revolutionary War broke out, Smith served as a deputy colonel of a militia unit.

In 1776, he was appointed as a delegate to Pennsylvania's constitutional convention and was then elected to the Pennsylvania House of Representatives, serving in that capacity from 1776 until 1780. Smith was then chosen to be a delegate to the Continental Congress from 1781 to 1782.

Appointed as a judge of the Pennsylvania court of common pleas in 1791, Smith was subsequently appointed to the Supreme Court of Pennsylvania, a post he held from 1794 until 1809.

== Death and interment ==
Smith died in Philadelphia on March 31, 1809 and was buried in Christ Church Burial Ground.

== Controversy ==
While serving as a justice on the Supreme Court of Pennsylvania, Smith was impeached on March 23, 1804 by the Democratic–Republican-led Pennsylvania House of Representatives, along with two other Federalist justices of the Supreme Court, Edward Shippen IV and Jasper Yeates. The sole Democratic–Republican member of the court, who had been not in attendance on the day the court heard the case central to the impeachment, was not impeached. The justices were not removed, being acquitted in their impeachment trial before the Pennsylvania Senate in the vote held on January 28, 1805.

== See also ==
- George Wymberley Jones De Renne, Smith's grandson
