= Noble Wimberly Jones =

American politician

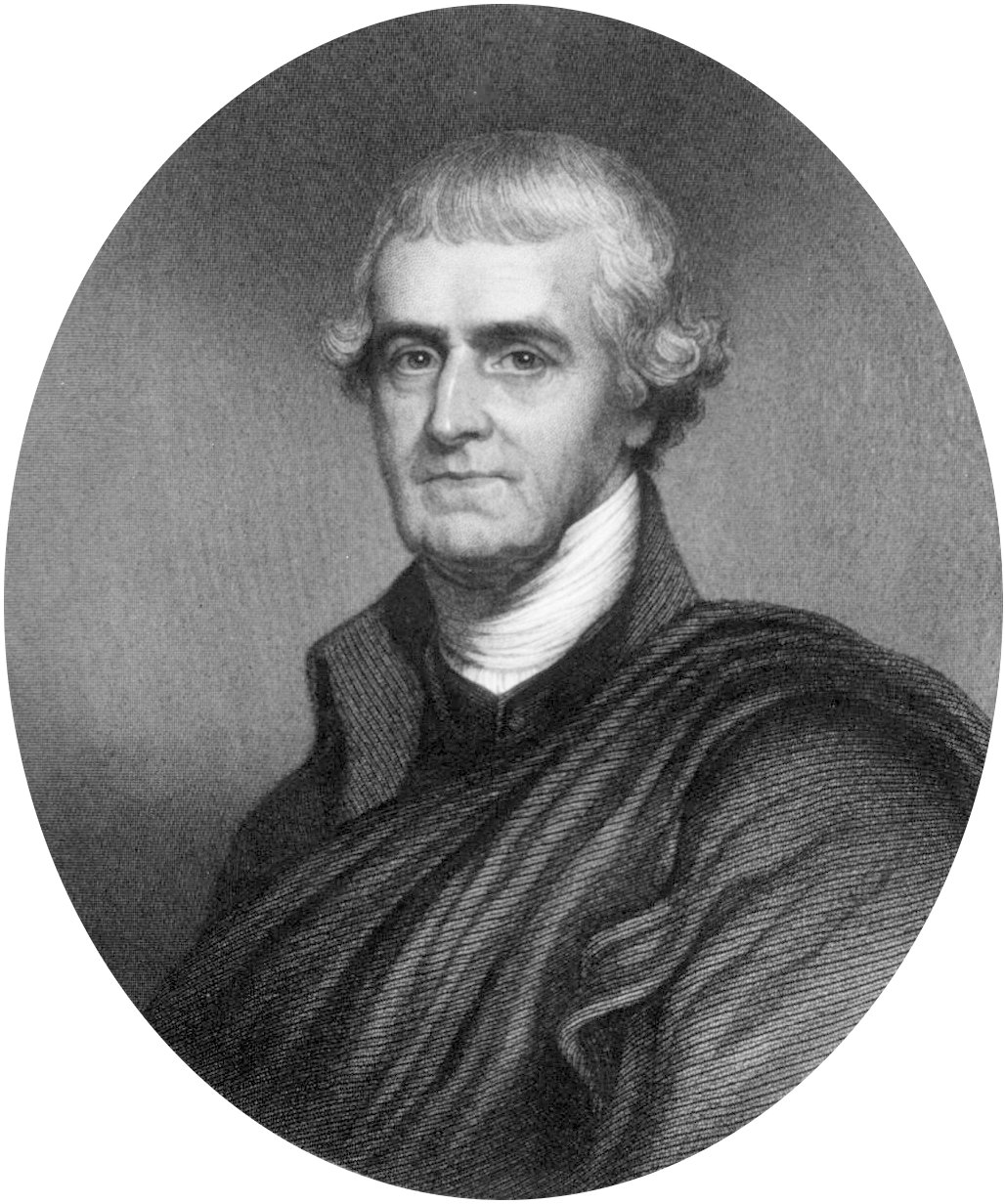
- Noble Wimberly Jones
- Born: c. 1723; Lambeth, Surrey, England
- Died: January 9, 1805 (aged 81–82); Savannah, Georgia, U.S.
- Occupations: physician; stateseman
- Spouse: Sarah Davis (m. 1755)
- Children: 14, including George Jones
- Parent: Noble Jones

Noble Wimberly Jones (c. 1723 – January 9, 1805) was an American physician and statesman from Savannah, Georgia. A leading Georgia patriot in the American Revolution, he served as a delegate to the Continental Congress in 1781 and 1782.

== Early years ==
Born in Lambeth, England, he immigrated to North America with his parents, who settled in Savannah in 1733, the first group of white settlers of the Province of Georgia. He was often known by his full name to distinguish him from his father, Noble Jones, who became one of the leading officials of the Province of Georgia.

As a youth, Jones served in the Georgia Militia under James Oglethorpe, helping to protect the province from Native Americans and the Spanish. Jones accumulated thousands of acres of land, including his estate at Wormsloe, in the young colony. His ownership of rice plantations located along the Ogeechee River which were cultivated by slaves contributed considerably to his income.

== Profession ==
Like his father, Jones became a physician, although neither apparently had any formal schooling in the field. He married Sarah Davis in 1755, with whom he had have fourteen children, including son George Jones, who would become a United States senator from Georgia. Jones practiced medicine in Savannah from 1756 to 1774.

== Pre-revolutionary political career ==
In 1755 Jones was elected to the province's lower legislative body, the Commons House of Assembly, serving until 1775, when the American Revolution terminated the Assembly's existence. After the 1765 Stamp Act, Jones was an outspoken critic of British policy. First elected Speaker of the House in 1768, he secured the services of Benjamin Franklin as Georgia's agent in London. Royal Governor James Wright saw Jones as a threat to royal authority, and dissolved the Assembly. In the years that followed, Jones was repeatedly elected Speaker, and each time Wright would respond by dissolving the Assembly.

== American Revolution ==
Following the passage of the Intolerable Acts by the British Parliament, in 1775 Jones helped form Georgia's Provincial Congress. He was twice elected as a delegate to the Second Continental Congress in 1775, but he did not attend due to the political turmoil in Georgia and the illness of his father, who died that year. He was a member of the Council of Safety by the end of 1775. When news reached Georgia of the Battles of Lexington and Concord, Jones and several others raided the colony's gunpowder magazine. According to tradition, some of this powder was sent to New England and was used by Patriots at the Battle of Bunker Hill.

== Post-revolutionary political career ==
When Governor Wright was forced out of Georgia in 1776, Jones and other revolutionaries assumed control of the colony. He helped write Georgia's 1777 state constitution and was elected Speaker of the new House of Assembly. The British recaptured Savannah in 1778, however, and Jones fled to Charleston, South Carolina. There he practiced medicine until, in 1780, the British also captured Charleston. He was held as a prisoner in St. Augustine, Florida, until he was exchanged in 1781. In that same year, Jones was referenced in a freemasonic calendar as the Provincial Grand Master of the Georgia region.His first available transportation took him to Philadelphia, Pennsylvania, where he was appointed as a delegate to Congress.

In 1782 when the British occupation ended Jones returned to Savannah. He continued to practice medicine, and in 1783 was again elected as Speaker of the Georgia House. He was president of the state constitutional convention in 1795.

== Death ==
Noble Wimberly Jones died in Savannah in 1805 and was interred in the family vault in the old South Broad St. Cemetery, now known as Colonial Park Cemetery. On May 18, 1880, his grandson, George Wymberley Jones De Renne, had Wimberly Jones's remains and those of the other family members contained in the old brick vault moved to a new family vault in Bonaventure Cemetery.

=== Memorial ===
A memorial to Jones stands in Savannah's Emmet Park.

== See also ==
- List of speakers of the Georgia House of Representatives
