= Elfrida De Renne Barrow =

American poet

- Born: Elfrida De Renne; January 7, 1884; Philadelphia, Pennsylvania, U.S.
- Died: October 1, 1970 (aged 86); Savannah, Georgia, U.S.
- Resting place: Wormsloe burial ground, near Savannah, Georgia, U.S.
- Spouse: Craig Barrow (1903–1945; his death)
- Parent(s): Wymberley Jones De Renne; Laura Norris De Renne

Elfrida De Renne Barrow (January 7, 1884 – October 1, 1970) was an author and poet who was honored as a Georgia Woman of Achievement. She joined the Georgia Historical Society in 1920 as a curator and one of the first women allowed into the organization. In her years as curator, some of her articles were published in the Society's journal, and she also began to have her poetry published.

== Early life ==
De Renne was born in Philadelphia, Pennsylvania, in 1884 to Wymberley Jones De Renne and Laura Norris Camblos.

== Poetry ==
In 1920, she co-founded The Poetry Society of Georgia with four other women, calling themselves the "Prosodists." The women brought poet and editor Harriet Monroe to Savannah, Georgia, to review their poetry, leading to Monroe's journal Poetry featuring Barrow's poetry. The journal continued to publish Barrow's poetry for many years.

== Wormsloe Foundation ==
In 1931, De Renne took over her brother's mortgage at the Wormsloe Plantation, where the family had upheld a tradition of printing publications and building a library, which culminated in the building of the De Renne Georgia Library in 1907. When Barrow and her husband moved to Athens, Georgia, she made the library collection available to the University of Georgia. In 1951, De Renne founded the Wormsloe Foundation, turning over the majority of the publications.

== Personal life ==
De Renne married Craig Barrow, a physician from Athens, in 1903. They had three children: Craig III, Elfrida and Muriel. The family moved to the Wormsloe Foundation in 1938.

== Death ==
De Renne died in 1970, aged 86. She had survived her husband by 25 years, and was buried beside him in the Wormsloe burial ground.

== Works ==
- Anchored Yesterdays:The Log Book of Savannah's Voyage Across a Georgia Century: in Ten Watches

== See also ==
- George Wymberley Jones De Renne, Barrow's philanthropic grandfather
