= Noble Jones =

English colonist (1702-1775)

- Born: June 20, 1702; Herefordshire, England
- Died: November 2, 1775 (aged 73); Savannah, Georgia, United States
- Spouse: Sarah Hack
- Children: 4, including Noble Wimberly Jones

Noble Jones (June 20, 1702 – November 2, 1775), an English-born carpenter, was one of the first settlers of the Province of Georgia in colonial America and one of its leading officials. He was born in Herefordshire. As part of General James Edward Oglethorpe's 42nd (old) Regiment of Foot, he commanded Georgia's Northern Company of Marines during the War of Jenkins' Ear (1739–1748). He was the father of Noble Wimberly Jones, a physician, Speaker of the Georgia House of Representatives, and prominent leader of the Georgia patriots during the American Revolution.

Jones established the Wormsloe Plantation, located 8 miles (13 km) from Savannah, Province of Georgia, in the late 1730s. Most of the plantation is now open to the public as a state historic site.

== Personal life ==
Jones married Sarah Hack, with whom he had four children: Noble Wimberly, Sarah, Mary and Inigo. Mary became the fourth wife of James Bulloch, an English emigrant to America in 1729.

== Death ==
Jones died in 1775, aged 73. He was interred at the Wormsloe burial ground, before being removed to Colonial Park Cemetery, then Bonaventure Cemetery. His wife and son, Inigo, remain interred at Wormsloe.

== See also ==
- History of Augusta, Georgia
