= List of Savannah College of Art and Design people =

This is a list of Savannah College of Art and Design people who have some significant affiliation with the school. Individuals listed may have only attended the university at one point, and may not necessarily have graduated.

== Faculty ==
Name	Department	Notability	Reference
John Edgar Browning	Liberal Arts	Professor of Liberal Arts, author, editor, and scholar recognized internationally for his nonfiction works about the horror genre and vampires in film, literature, and culture	
Jill Bullitt	Visual Art	Professor of Painting, award-winning artist	
Stephen Geller	English	Professor of English and Dramatic Writing, author, screenwriter of Slaughterhouse-Five	
Tom Hardy	Design Management	Professor of Design Management: award-winning industrial designer, design strategist and former corporate head of the worldwide IBM Design Program	
Suzanne Jackson	Visual Art	Professor of Painting (1996 to 2009), visual artist, gallery owner, poet, dancer, and set designer	
Christopher McDonnell	Fashion	Founder of eponymous British and US fashion label Christopher McDonnell and co-founder of London boutique/brand Marrian-McDonnell; Queen fashion editor	
Michael Nolin	Film & Television	Professor of Screenwriting, screenwriter and producer of Mr. Holland's Opus	
Sharon Ott	Performing Arts	Artistic director of Performing Arts department, winner of the 1997 Regional Theatre Tony Award for her work as Artistic Director of the Berkeley Repertory Theatre	
David E. Stone	Sound Design	Won an Academy Award for the film Bram Stoker's Dracula for Best Sound Editing at the 65th Academy Awards	

== Alumni ==
Name	Class year	Notability	Reference(s)
Nabil Abou-Harb	2007	Filmmaker and writer	
Mir Zafar Ali		Visual effects artist	
Natalia Arias	2000	Photographer	
Brad Benischek		Visual artist	
Scott Blake	2003	Artist	
Bob Bland		Fashion designer and activist, co-chair of the 2017 Women's March	
Jacen Burrows	1996	Comic book artist	
Mary Cagle	2013	Webcomic artist, creator of Sleepless Domain	
Kayli Carter		Actress	
Donny Cates		Comic book artist	
Don Chapman		Architect and politician, member of the South Carolina House of Representatives	
Lauren Clay	2004	Artist	
Comic Book Girl 19		YouTube personality and adult model	
Danny!		Recording artist for Questlove's Okayplayer Records and record producer for MTV's Hype Music production library	
Leila Djansi		Filmmaker and writer	
Angela Dominguez		Children's book author and illustrator	
Heather Doram	1996	Designer of the Antigua & Barbuda national costume	
Mark Eshbaugh		Artist, author and educator	
Scott Fischer	1994	Artist	
Nickson Fong	1994	Computer graphics artist and the first Singaporean to receive an Academy Award	
Zack Fox		Stand-up comedian and rapper	
Brian Hagan	1994	Artist	
Dan Hentschel	2018	Comedian and satirical creator	
Azède Jean-Pierre		Fashion designer	
Alphonso Jordan		Track and field athlete	
Tomas Kalnoky		Lead singer of the ska punk band Streetlight Manifesto, and the musical collective Bandits of the Acoustic Revolution; first lead singer for the band Catch 22	
Andrew Kasch		Film director and editor	
M. Alice LeGrow	2003	Alternative comics artist; creator of the graphic novel series Bizenghast	
Christina Leslie	2022	Photographer	
Luna Brothers	2001/2003	Comics/graphic novel creators of Ultra, Girls, and The Sword (Image), and artists for Spider-Woman (Marvel)	
Joshua Rashaad McFadden		Visual artist	
Anis Mojgani		Spoken word poet	
Ricardo de Montreuil		Filmmaker	
Tradd Moore	2010	Comic book artist	
David Rush Morrison		Cinematographer	
Lavar Munroe	2007	Artist	
Sean Murphy		Comic book writer and artist	
Recho Omondi	2011	Fashion designer	
Andrew Ondrejcak		Artist	
Jimmy O'Neal		Painter	
Meredith Pardue	1998	Abstract painter	
Peg Parnevik		Swedish singer, songwriter, and television personality, known for starring in Parneviks	
Ben Passmore		Comics artist	
Michael Phillippi	1997	Artist	
Momo Pixel		Video game designer and advertiser	
Bevin Prince		Actress and fitness instructor	
Biqtch Puddin'		Drag artist, winner of season two of The Boulet Brothers' Dragula	
Rachel Raab		Photographer and artist	
Nic Rad		Artist	
Residente	MFA	Four-time Grammy Award recipient; singer and founder of the alternative hip hop group Calle 13	
Christopher John Rogers	2016	Fashion designer	
Daniel Roher		Documentary film director	
Claire Rosen	2006	Photographer; known for her series "Birds of a Feather;" included in Forbes magazine's "30 Brightest Under 30" lists in Art & Design	
Kenneth R. Rosen	2014	Writer, journalist and war correspondent	
Samuel Shaw	2006	Professional wrestler, wrestled in WWE as Dexter Lumis	
Rejjie Snow		Rapper and songwriter	
Christian Sottile	1997	Architect and urban designer	
Nathan Spoor		Artist, writer and art critic	
Irene Strychalski		Comic book artist	
Kelly Thompson		Writer	
Daniel Thrasher	2015	YouTuber	
Mayday Trippe	2003	Comic book artist and illustrator	
Ngozi Ukazu	2015	Cartoonist and graphic novelist	
Ingrid Vanderveldt	1993 (Masters /Architecture)	Businesswoman, media personality, and investor	
Summer Wheat	2005	Artist	
Jarrett Williams	2006 (BFA), 2010 (MFA)	Comic creator and writer known for his comic Super Pro K.O.!	
Jefferson Wood	1995	Penciler on Big Bang Comics for Image Comics, two-time Pollstar Award winner; Billboard magazine Number 18 best rock poster artist of all time	
Tracy Yardley		Comic book artist	
David Zennie		Director and producer	
Cody Ziglar		Television and comics writer	
Charlie Zink	2001	Major League Baseball pitcher	

== See also ==
- List of people from Savannah, Georgia
