= Akintunde =

Nigerian Given Name

- Gender: Male
- Language: Yoruba

Origin
- Origin: Nigerian
- Meaning: The brave one is back
- Region of origin: South-West Nigeria

pronunciation

Akíntúndé is a Nigerian surname of Yoruba origin which means "The brave one is here again". It can also translate to "The valiant one is back". Notable variants of the name includes "Tunde" "Akin" e.t.c.

== Notable people bearing the name ==
- Akintunde Warnock, comedian
- James Akintunde, footballer
- Akintunde Sawyerr, Nigerian diplomat
- Akintunde Akinleye, Nigerian photojournalist
- Ifedayo Akintunde, Nigerian engineer
- Akintunde Akinwande, professor
- Akintunde Akinsehinwa, Nigerian military officer
- Folayegbe Akintunde-Ighodalo, activist
- Richard Ayodele Akintunde, Nigerian lawyer
- Akintunde Popoola, Anglican bishop
- Omowale Akintunde, film director
- Akintunde Aduwo, retired Nigerian Navy Vice Admiral
