= List of people from Savannah, Georgia =

This is a list of people from Savannah, Georgia, the largest city and the county seat of Chatham County, Georgia. It includes people who were born or lived in Savannah, Georgia, for a non-trivial amount of time. Individuals included in this listing are people presumed to be notable because they have received significant coverage in reliable sources that are independent of the subject. (Note: Notability for inclusion in this listing is based upon the standards outlined in Wikipedia:Notability.)

Savannah was established in 1733 and was the first colonial and state capital of Georgia. It is known as America's first planned city and attracts millions of visitors who enjoy the city's architecture and historic structures such as the birthplace of Juliette Gordon Low (founder of the Girl Scouts of the United States of America), the Telfair Academy of Arts and Sciences (one of the South's first public museums), Mercer House, featured in Midnight in the Garden of Good and Evil (which is set in Savannah), the First African Baptist Church (one of the oldest black Baptist congregations in the United States), Temple Mickve Israel (the third oldest synagogue in America), and the Central of Georgia Railway roundhouse complex (the oldest standing antebellum rail facility in America). Today, Savannah's downtown area is one of the largest National Historic Landmark Districts in the United States (designated in 1966). (Note: Savannah had 24 original squares. Today 21 are still in existence.)

== Savannah natives ==
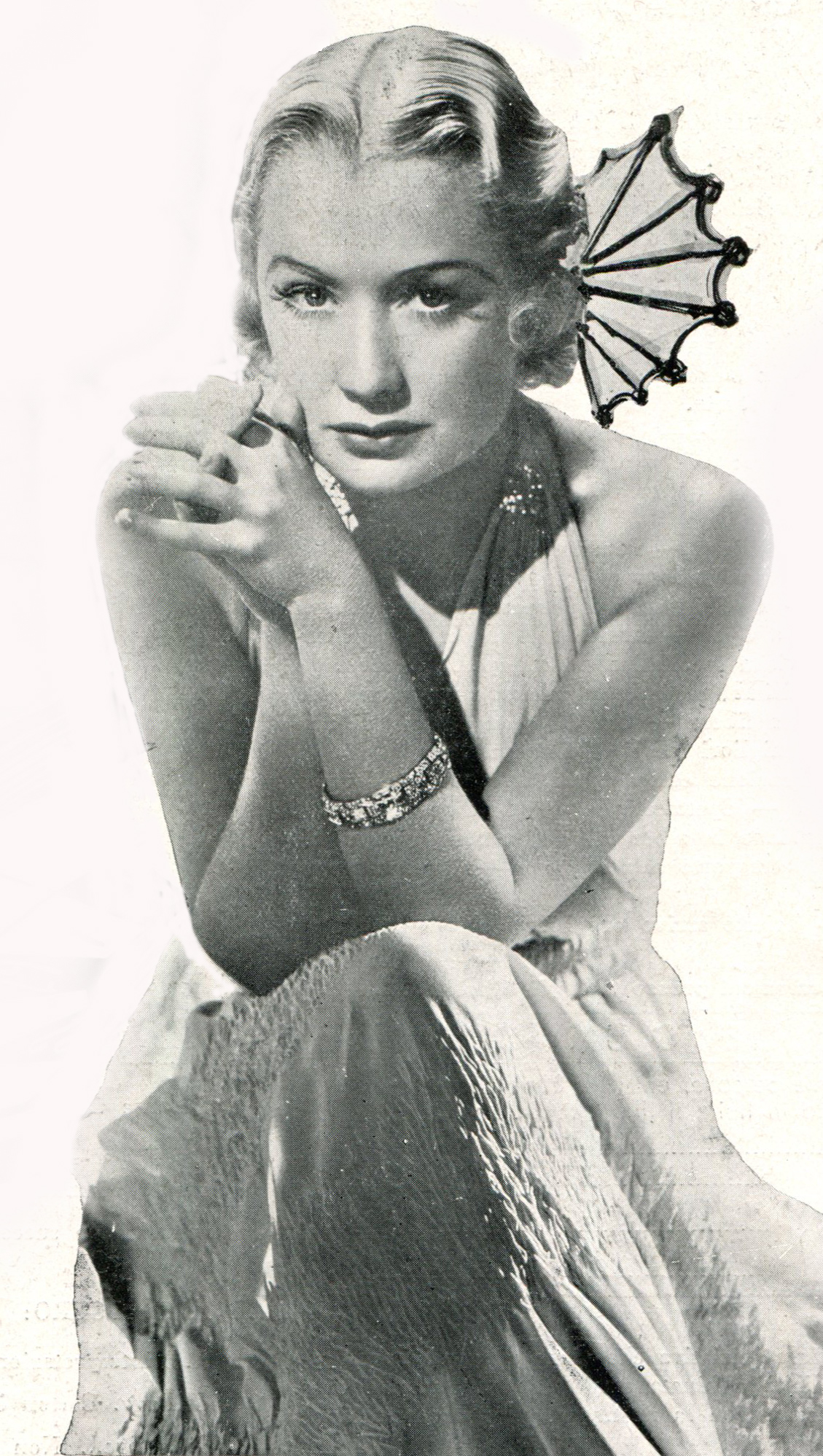
Actress Miriam Hopkins in 1936

Name	Notability	References
Dianna Agron	actress, known for role as Quinn Fabray on the TV series Glee	
Charles Coburn	Academy Award-winning actor (1943: Best Actor in a Supporting Role for The More the Merrier)	
Desmond Harrington	2004 Málaga International Week of Fantastic Cinema Award-winning actor (Best Actor for Love Object)	
J. G. Hertzler	actor from Star Trek Deep Space Nine series	
Miriam Hopkins	Golden Globe and Academy Award-nominated actress	
James Keach	actor and Producers Guild Awards-nominated producer (2006: Motion Picture Producer of the Year Award Theatrical Motion Pictures for Walk the Line) (Note: The 2006 Producers Guild Award nomination (Motion Picture Producer of the Year Award) was shared with Cathy Konrad.)	
Stacy Keach	Academy Award-nominated and Golden Globe-winning actor (1989: Best Performance by an Actor in a Mini-Series or Motion Picture Made for TV for Hemingway) (Note: Tied with Michael Caine ("Jack the Ripper") for the 1989 Golden Globe Award for Best Performance by an Actor in a Mini-Series or Motion Picture Made for TV.)	
Isabel Keating	Tony Award-nominated actress and singer (2004: Best Featured Actress in a Musical)	
Mammy Lou	world's oldest actress	
Augusta Oelschig	American Scene painter known for realist genre paintings of everyday life in Savannah	
Alicia Rhett	actress in the film Gone with the Wind	
Diana Scarwid	Academy Award and Emmy-nominated actress	
Fredi Washington	1930s film actress who appeared in The Emperor Jones and Imitation of Life	

=== Athletes ===
Name	Notability	References
Taz Anderson	NFL tight end for the St. Louis Cardinals (1961–1964) and Atlanta Falcons (1966–1967)	
George Atkinson	AFL and NFL safety and kick returner for the Oakland Raiders (1968–1977) and the Denver Broncos (1979); member of Raiders' Super Bowl XI championship team, AFL All-Star (1968, 1969)	
Edwin Bailey	NFL guard for the Seattle Seahawks (1981–1991)	
Solomon Brannan	AFL defensive back and running back for the Kansas City Chiefs (1965–1966) and New York Jets (1967); member of the Chiefs' 1966 AFL championship team	
Leroy Brown	professional wrestler known by ring names "Leroy Brown," "Elijah Akeem," "Georgia Sweets," and "Muhammad Jabbar"	
Bucky Dent	MLB shortstop for the Chicago White Sox (1973–1976), New York Yankees (1977–1982), Texas Rangers (1982–1983), and Kansas City Royals (1984), and manager for the New York Yankees (1989–1990), 1978 World Series Most Valuable Player, MLB All-Star (1975, 1980, 1981), MLB World Series Champion (1977, 1978)	
Demarcus Dobbs	NFL defensive end for the San Francisco 49ers (2011–2014) and Seattle Seahawks (2014–2015)	
Pervis Ellison	NBA center for the Sacramento Kings (1989–1990), Washington Bullets (1990–1994), Boston Celtics (1994–2000) and Seattle SuperSonics (2000); nicknamed "Never Nervous Pervis"; led University of Louisville to national championship; named Most Outstanding Player as freshman	
JaKeenan Gant	basketball player for Hapoel Be'er Sheva of the Israeli Basketball Premier League	
John Gant	MLB pitcher for the Atlanta Braves (2016), St. Louis Cardinals (2017–2021), and Minnesota Twins (2021)	
Cody Hall	MLB pitcher for the San Francisco Giants (2015), and Miami Marlins (2016)	
Cheryl Haworth	Olympic weightlifting medalist (bronze, 2000); 1998–2005 national champion; 2001 and 2002 junior world champion	
Percy Howard	NFL wide receiver for the Dallas Cowboys (1975–1977)	
Flau'jae Johnson	rapper and college basketball player for the LSU Tigers of the Southeastern Conference (SEC)	
Aaron Jones	NFL running back for the Green Bay Packers (2017–2023) and Minnesota Vikings (2024–present)	
Kevin Mawae	NFL center for the Seattle Seahawks (1994–1997), New York Jets (1998–2005), and Tennessee Titans (2006–2009)	
Dustin McGowan	MLB pitcher for the Toronto Blue Jays (2005–2008, 2011, 2013–2014), Philadelphia Phillies (2015), and Miami Marlins (2016–2017)	
Jordan McRae	NBA, NBL, Liga ACB, CBA, LNB Pro A, and Israeli Basketball Premier League shooting guard for Melbourne United (2014–2015), Phoenix Suns (2016), Cleveland Cavaliers (2016–2017), Baskonia (2017–2018), Washington Wizards (2018–2020), Denver Nuggets (2020), Detroit Pistons (2020), Beijing Ducks (2020–2021), Metropolitans 92 (2021–2022), and Hapoel Tel Aviv (2022–present)	
Casey Mitchell	basketball player for Elitzur Ashkelon of the Israeli Basketball Premier League	
Bobby Norfleet	NASCAR driver	
Terry Orr	NFL tight end for the Washington Redskins (1986–1990 and 1991–1993) and San Diego Chargers (1990)	
Gerald Perry	MLB first baseman for the Atlanta Braves (1983–1989), Kansas City Royals (1990), and St. Louis Cardinals (1991–1995) and hitting coach for the Seattle Mariners (2000–2002), Pittsburgh Pirates (2003–2005), Oakland Athletics (2006, 2011), and Chicago Cubs (2007–2009)	
Marty Pevey	MLB catcher for the Montreal Expos (1989), coach for the Toronto Blue Jays, manager for the Peoria Chiefs (2009), Iowa Cubs (2013), and catching coordinator for the Toronto Blue Jays minor leagues (2010–2012)	
Alex Poythress	NBA, CBA, BSL, VTB United League, and Israeli Basketball Premier League power forward for the Philadelphia 76ers (2017), Indiana Pacers (2017–2018), Atlanta Hawks (2018–2019), Jilin Northeast Tigers (2019), Galatasaray (2019–2020), Zenit Saint Petersburg (2020–2022), and Maccabi Tel Aviv (2022–present)	
Andrew Provence	NFL defensive tackle for the Atlanta Falcons (1983–1987), Denver Broncos (1988–1989)	
Tim Quarterman	NBA, Liga Leumit, National Basketball League, CIBACOPA, and Macedonian League point guard for the Portland Trail Blazers (2016–2017), Houston Rockets (2018), Ironi Nahariya (2018), Super City Rangers (2019), Caballeros de Culiacán (2021–2022), and KK Feniks 2010 (2022–present)	
Josh Reddick	MLB outfielder for the Boston Red Sox (2009–2011), Oakland Athletics (2012–2016), Los Angeles Dodgers (2016), Houston Astros (2017–2020), and Arizona Diamondbacks (2021)	
Eron Riley	wide receiver, National and Canadian Football Leagues; initially signed by Baltimore Ravens (2009–2010), then Carolina Panthers (2010), Denver Broncos (2010–2011), New York Jets (2011), and Saskatchewan Roughriders (2013–2014)	
Kenny Rogers	MLB pitcher for the Texas Rangers (1989–1995, 2000–2002, 2004–2005), New York Yankees (1996–1997), Oakland Athletics (1998–1999), New York Mets (1999), Minnesota Twins (2003), and Detroit Tigers (2006–2008)	
Gene Sauers	PGA Tour golfer, 2016 U.S. Senior Open champion	
Al Seeger	former International Boxing Association world super-bantamweight title holder	
Jason Shiell	MLB pitcher for the San Diego Padres (2002), Boston Red Sox (2003), Atlanta Braves (2006)	
Roy Simmons	NFL guard for the New York Giants (1979–1982) and Washington Redskins (1983)	
Nolan Smith	NFL linebacker for the Philadelphia Eagles (2023–present)	
Hollis Stacy	three-time U.S. Women's Open champion golfer (1977, 1978, and 1984)	
Indiana Vassilev	association football player for St. Louis City SC in Major League Soccer	
J. B. Wendelken	MLB and NPB pitcher for the Oakland Athletics (2016, 2018–2021), Arizona Diamondbacks (2021–2022), and Yokohama DeNA BayStars (2023–present)	
Dusty Zeigler	NFL center for the Buffalo Bills (1996–1999) and New York Giants (2000–2002)	

=== Business people ===
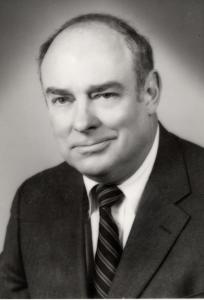
Former Savannah Mayor and businessman J.C. Lewis, Jr. (used with permission)

Name	Notability	References
Mills B. Lane Jr.	former president of Atlanta, Georgia-based Citizens and Southern National Bank who played an important role in Atlanta's political development and economic expansion during the 1950s and 1960s	
Julius Curtis Lewis Jr.	businessman, philanthropist, former Savannah mayor	

=== Judicial ===
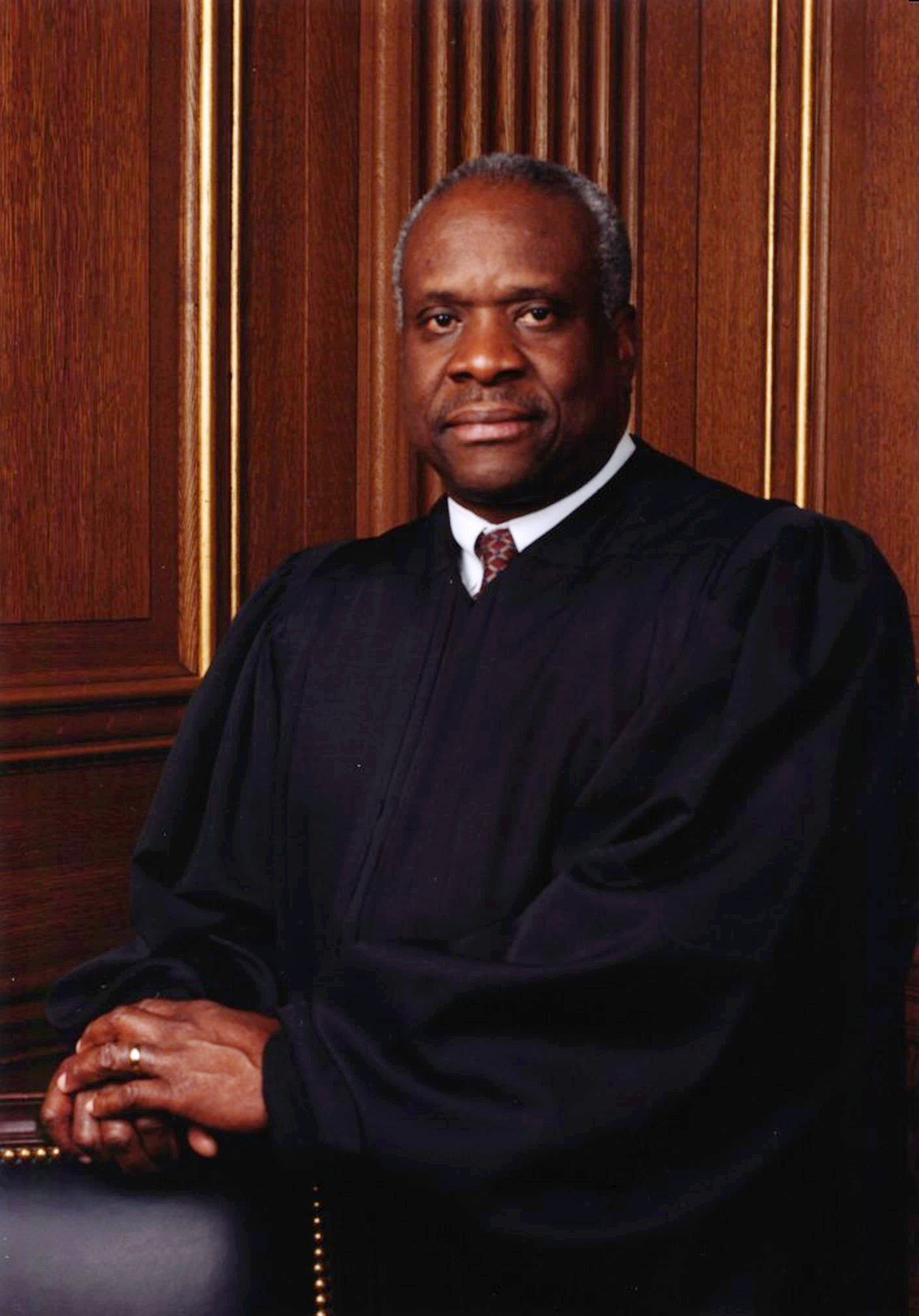
Official 2004 photo of Justice Clarence Thomas

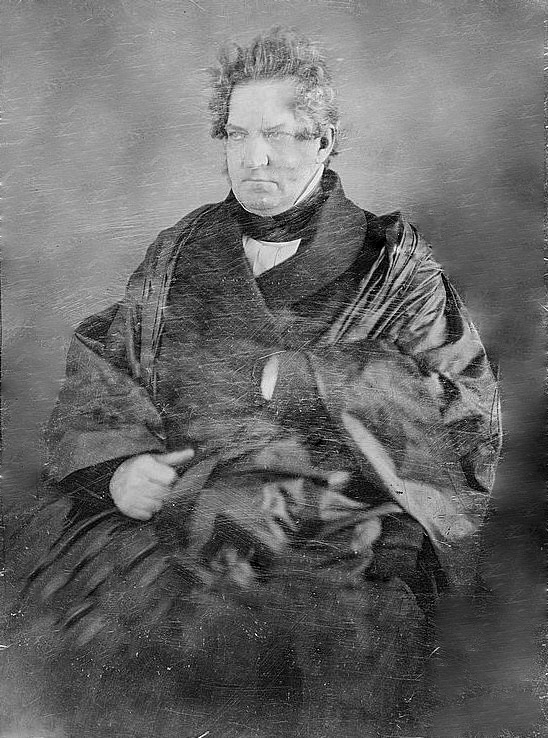
James Moore Wayne

Name	Notability	References
Orinda D. Evans	judge, U. S. District Court, Northern District of Georgia (1979–2006) and chief district judge (1999–2006)	
Clarence Thomas	associate justice of the Supreme Court of the United States (October 19, 1991–present)	
James Moore Wayne	congressman and associate justice of the Supreme Court of the United States (January 14, 1835 – July 5, 1867)	
Walter Wyatt	former Reporter of Decisions of the Supreme Court of the United States (1946–1963)	

=== Military ===
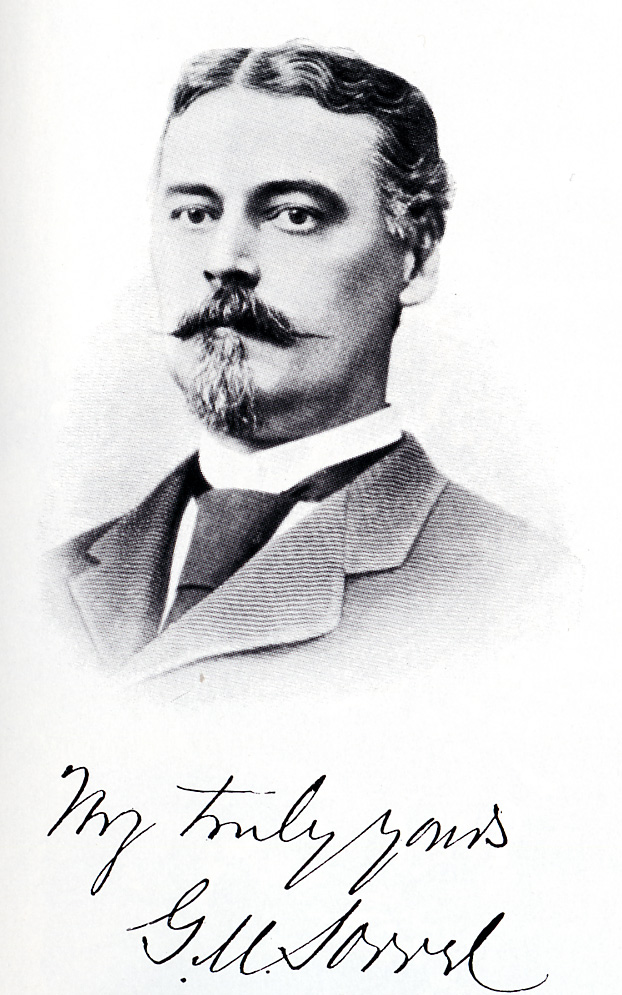
Photo of Moxley Sorrel from From Manassas to Appomattox: Memoirs of the Civil War in America

Name	Notability	References
Robert Houston Anderson	cavalry and artillery officer in Confederate States Army during American Civil War	
James Dunwoody Bulloch	Confederate States of America's chief foreign agent in Great Britain during Civil War	
Brendan A. Burns	U.S. Army major general	
William V. Davis	vice admiral and naval aviator in the United States Navy, commanded the USS Franklin D. Roosevelt (CV-42)	
Leonard Matlovich	Purple Heart and Bronze Star recipient; gay rights activist	
Edward C. Peter II	U.S. Army lieutenant general	
Moxley Sorrel	general in Confederate Army, famous aide to General James Longstreet	
Julian Larcombe Schley	former governor of Panama Canal Zone	
Josiah Tattnall III	officer in U.S. Navy during War of 1812, Second Barbary War, and Mexican–American War	
William F. Train	U.S. Army lieutenant general and veteran of World War II, Korean War and Vietnam War	

=== Musicians ===
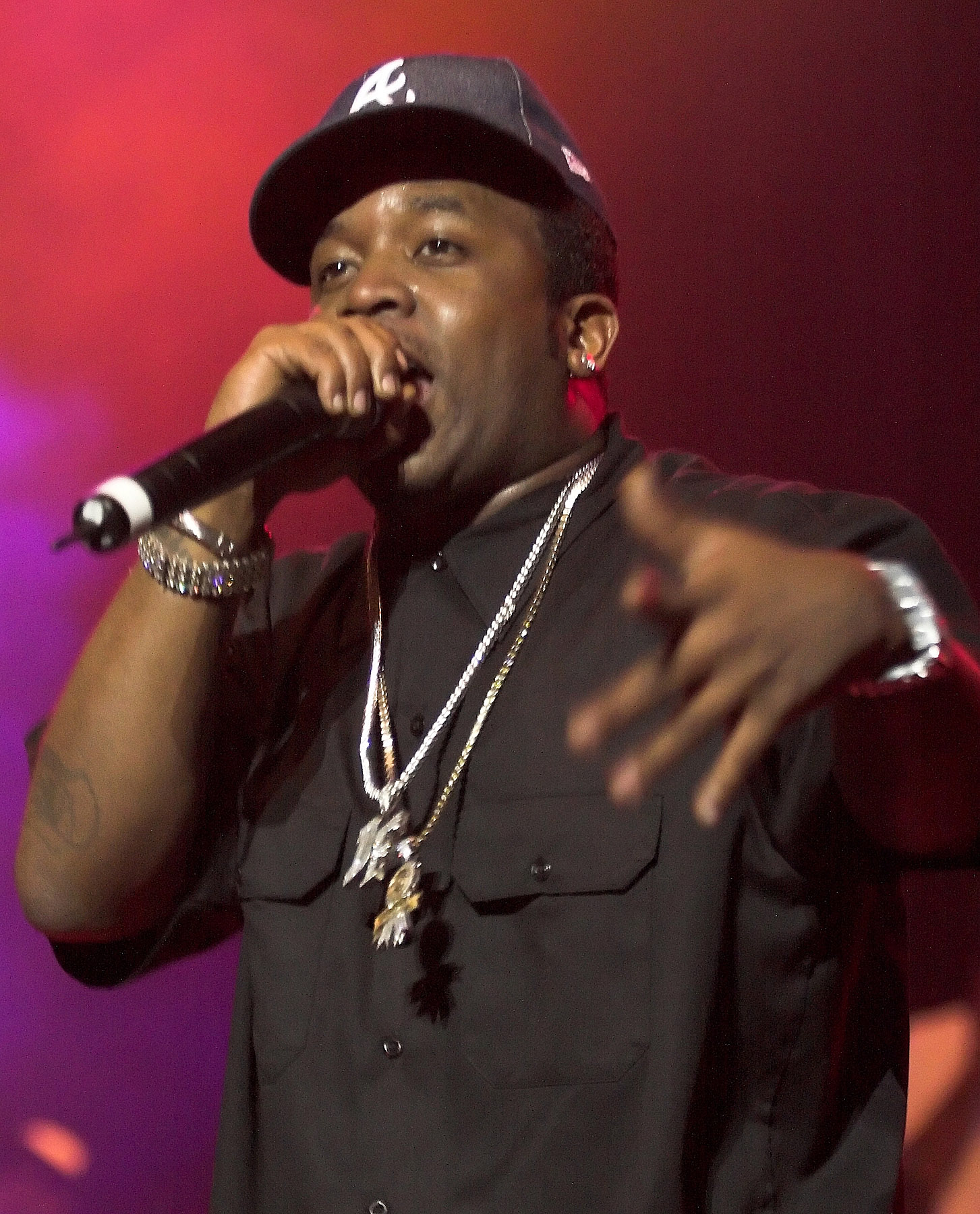
Big Boi from Outkast playing at Alexander Memorial Coliseum in Atlanta, Georgia

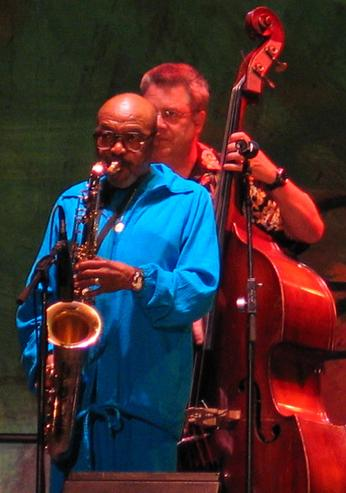
James Moody performing during a jazz festival

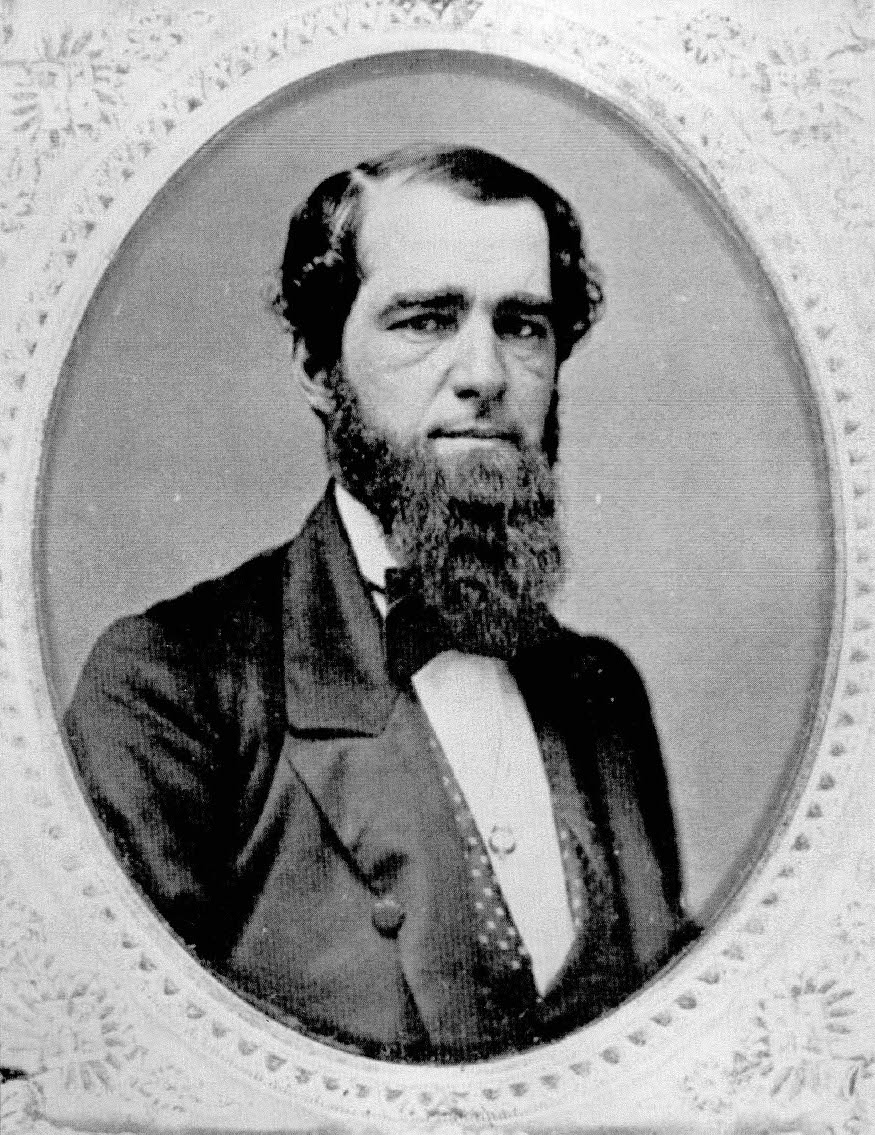
James Lord Pierpont

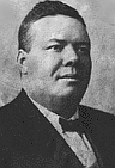
Tom Turpin

Name	Notability	References
Baroness	metal music band whose Red Album (2007) was named Album of the Year by heavy metal magazine Revolver	
Big Boi	rapper from Grammy Award-winning hip-hop music duo OutKast	
Camoflauge	rapper	
Circle Takes the Square	post-hardcore screamo band whose debut album As the Roots Undo (2004) had consideration amount of praise within the hardcore genre	
Mike Curb	Curb Records and Word Label Group executive; lieutenant governor of California (1979–1983)	
Stephanie Edwards	11th-place finalist on American Idol, season 6	
Kylesa	metal music band	
DJ Lord	music turntablist currently with hip hop group Public Enemy	
Kate McTell	blues musician; former wife of blues musician Blind Willie McTell	
Johnny Mercer	composer of more than 1,000 songs; received 19 Academy Award nominations; wrote music for Broadway shows; singer; co-founded Capitol Records	
Megan Moroney	country music singer	
James Moody	jazz musician (saxophone, flute), composer, actor known for his song "Moody's Mood for Love"	
Nivea	R&B singer	
James Lord Pierpont	songwriter of "Jingle Bells"; uncle of J.P. Morgan	
Ben Riley	hard bop drummer who worked with artists including Thelonious Monk and Stan Getz	
Sahib Shihab	jazz saxophonist and flautist who performed with Thelonious Monk, Art Blakey Dizzy Gillespie, and Quincy Jones	
Showbread	Christian post-hardcore alternative rock band	
Squad 5-O	Christian ska-punk	
Tom Turpin	composer credited with the first published ragtime by an African-American ("Harlem Rag", 1897)	
Jared Wade	country music singer-songwriter	
Trummy Young	swing-era trumbonist who performed with Charlie Parker, Dizzy Gillespie, Jazz at the Philharmonic, and Louis Armstrong All-Stars	

=== Politicians ===
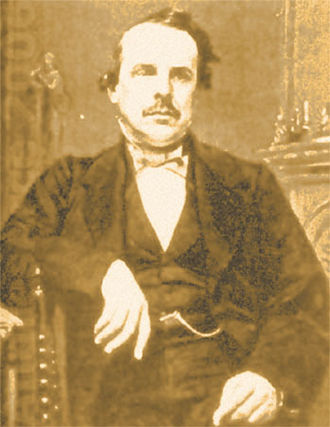
Francis S. Bartow

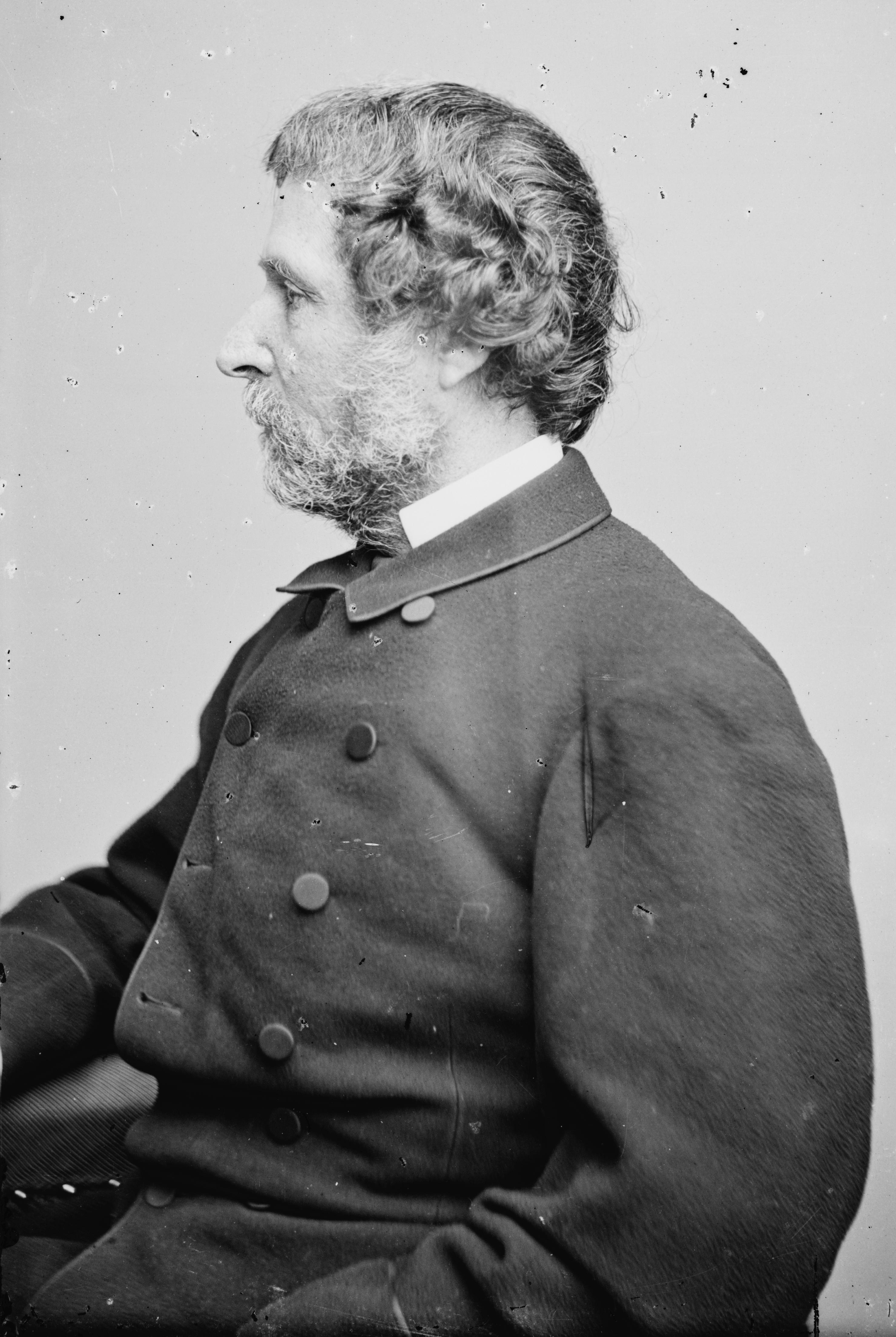
Library of Congress photo of John C. Frémont

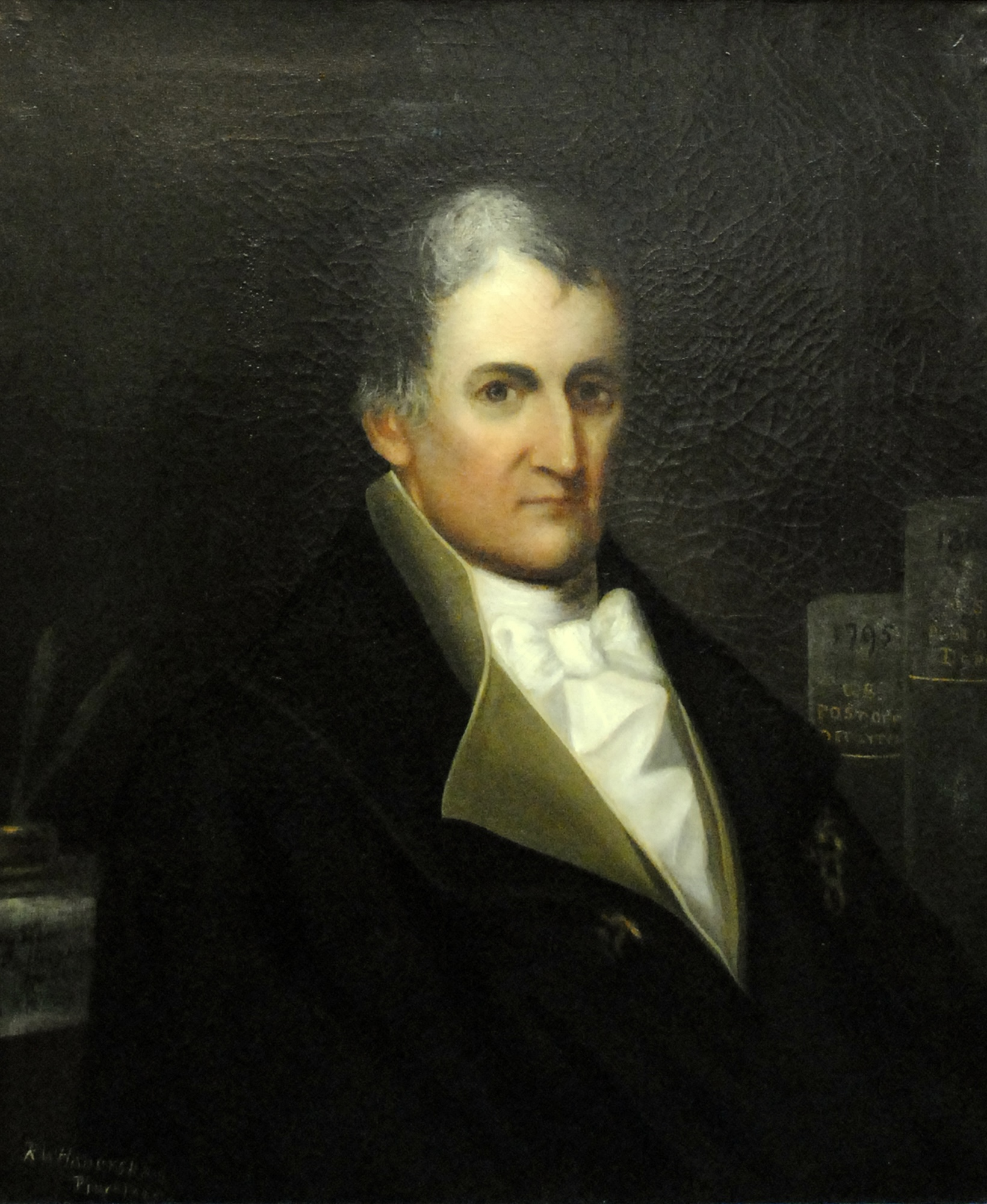
Joseph Habersham

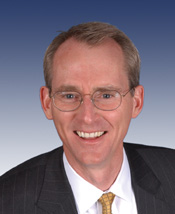
Official U.S. Congress photo of Bob Inglis, member of the United States House of Representatives

Name	Notability	References
Francis S. Bartow	Confederate States of America political leader, and military officer during the early months of the American Civil War	
Joseph Bryan	U.S. representative from Georgia who served in the 8th and 9th U.S. Congresses (from 1803 until his resignation in 1806)	
William Bellinger Bulloch	senator from Georgia appointed as a Democratic Republican to the United States Senate, served from April 8, 1813, until November 6, 1813	
Robert M. Charlton	U.S. senator representing Georgia from 1852 to 1853	
Alfred Cuthbert	U.S. representative (the Thirteenth and Fourteenth Congress, 1813–1816) and senator (Seventeenth, Eighteenth, and Nineteenth Congresses, from 1821 to 1827)	
Samuel Elbert	governor of the State of Georgia (1785–1786)	
Ion Farris	speaker of the Florida House of Representatives (1909 and 1913) and member of Florida Senate	
John C. Frémont	first U.S. Republican Party candidate for president of the United States; 1864 candidate of the Radical Republicans)	
Joseph Habersham	delegate to the Congress of the Confederation (1785); member of the convention which ratified the U.S. Constitution (1788); 3rd Postmaster General of the United States (1795–1801)	
F. Ross Holland, Jr.	National Park Service historian noted for his books on lighthouses	
William Houstoun	delegate to the Continental Congress and to the United States Constitutional Convention (1787)	
Bob Inglis	twice elected to represent South Carolina's 4th congressional district in the United States House of Representatives	
Otis Johnson	former mayor of Savannah, Georgia, first elected in 2004	
George Jones	U.S. senator, serving from August 27, 1807, to November 7, 1807	
Edward Langworthy	delegate to the Continental Congress from Georgia and signature to the U.S. Articles of Confederation	
John Milledge	elected to Second Congress (1792–1793) and Fourth and Fifth Congresses (1795–1799); again elected (1801 until he resigned in May 1802 to become governor of Georgia); U.S. Senate in 10th U.S. Congress as the president pro tempore of the Senate (1806–1809)	
Al Scott	appointed to serve as Georgia labor commissioner (1991–1992); first African-American constitutional officer in Georgia history; chair of the Chatham County Commissioners	
Dennis Smelt	U.S. representative to the 9th, 10th and 11th United States Congresses (1806–1811)	
Josiah Tattnall	U.S. senator (1796–1799) and Georgia governor (1801–1802)	
Thomas Telfair	elected to the 13th and 14th United States Congresses (1813–1817)	
Raphael Warnock	Democratic senator of Georgia, elected to serve during the 117th United States Congress (2021–present)	

=== Scientists and inventors ===
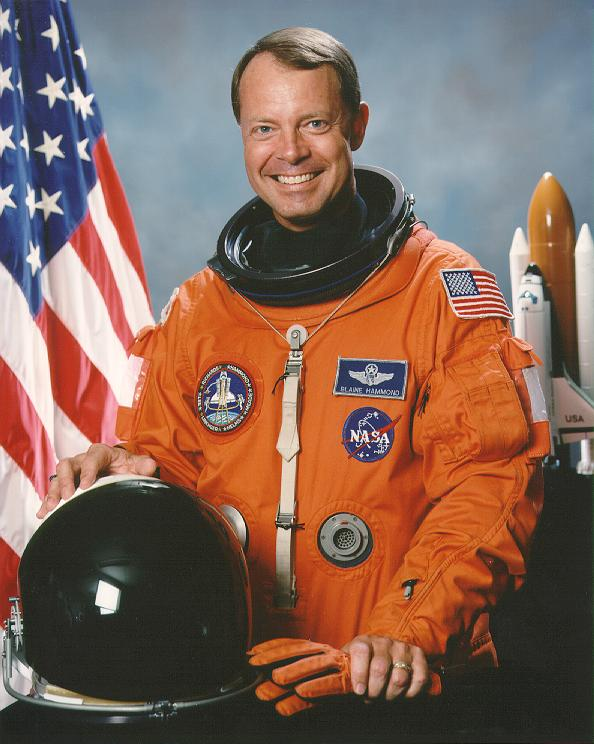
Official NASA photo of Col. L. Blaine Hammond

Name	Notability	References
Lillian Greneker	mannequin designer, invented a self-sealing fuel tank	
L. Blaine Hammond	NASA astronaut and former chief of NASA's Astronaut Office Safety Branch	
W. Jason Morgan	geophysicist, made seminal contributions to the theory of plate tectonics and geodynamics	

=== Writers ===
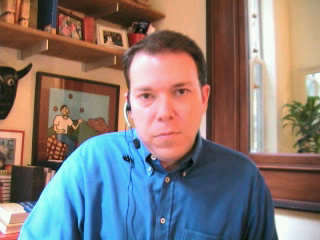
Author Bruce Feiler

Name	Notability	References		
Conrad Aiken	Pulitzer Prize for Poetry recipient for Selected Poems (1930)			
Henry Coppée	author, educator, first president of Lehigh University			
Charles Elmore	African-American scholar, jazz historian, and educator			
Bruce Feiler	journalist; formulated Feiler Faster Thesis; produced TV mini-series Abraham: A Journey to the Heart of Three Faiths			
Chris Fuhrman	author of The Dangerous Lives of Altar Boys			
Anne Green	novelist, memoirist, translator; sister of Julien Green			
Al Jaffee	writer and cartoonist for Timely Comics, Atlas Comics, and Mad Magazine		James Alan McPherson	writer and essayist, awarded 1978 Pulitzer Prize for Fiction for short story collection Elbow Room
Ward Morehouse	theater critic and newspaper columnist for Atlanta Journal, New York Tribune, New York Herald Tribune and New York Sun			
Sharlotte Neely	writer, anthropologist, author of Snowbird Cherokees			
Flannery O'Connor	writer and novelist, namesake of Flannery O'Connor Award for Short Fiction			
Charles Perry	author of Portrait of a Young Man Drowning, made into film Six Ways to Sunday			
Sally Quinn	author, reporter for Washington Post, co-anchor of CBS Morning News with reporter Hughes Rudd (August 6, 1973 - February 1, 1974)			
Marie Ravenel de La Coste	poet, author of Civil War ballad Somebody's Darling			
Mary Schmich	columnist for Chicago Tribune; author of Wear Sunscreen; writer of Brenda Starr, Reporter comic strip			
Frank Lebby Stanton	lyricist, columnist for Atlanta Constitution, author of words for "Just Awearyin' for You"			

=== Others ===
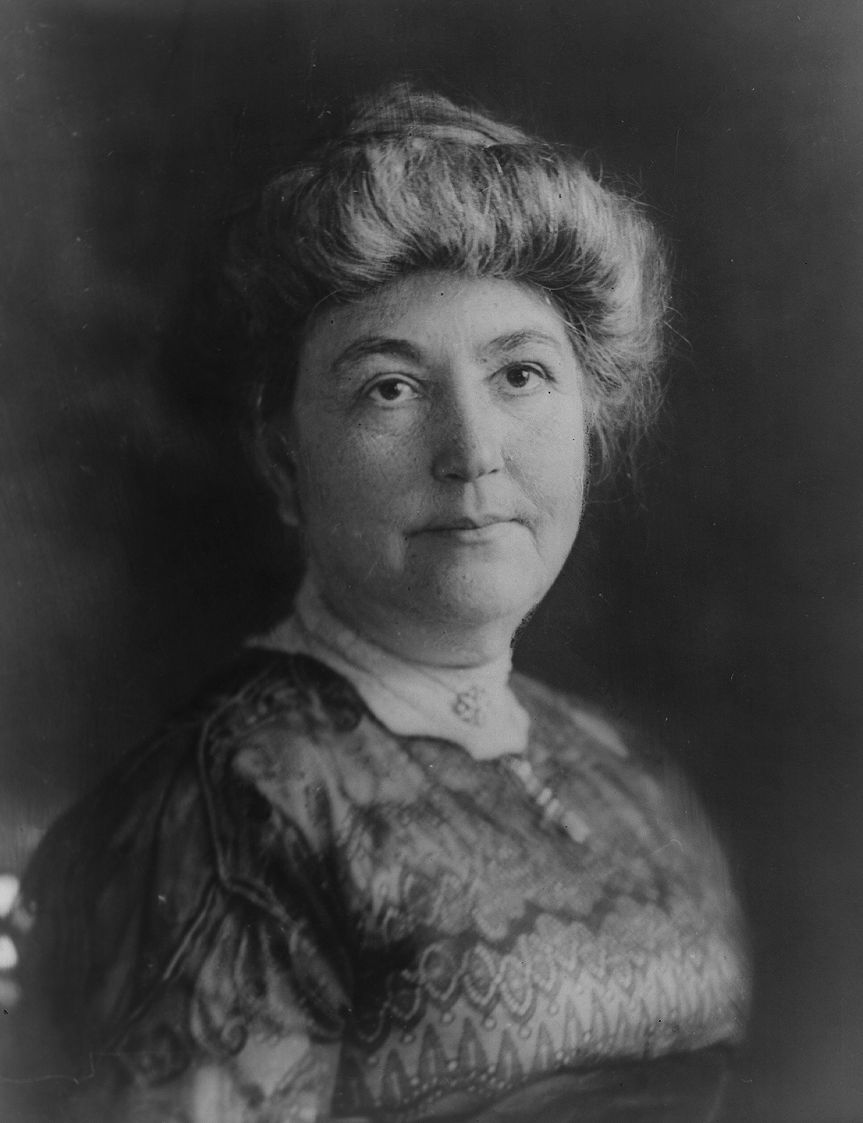
Library of Congress photo of First Lady Ellen Axson Wilson

Name	Notability	References
Iain Armitage	plays Sheldon Cooper on CBS's Young Sheldon	
Georgia Benton	school teacher known for becoming the first African-American member of the Georgia division of the United Daughters of the Confederacy	
Steve Charnovitz	law professor best known as scholar on international trade law	
Curtis Cooper	civil rights leader, served as president of Savannah Chapter of NAACP	
Ralph Mark Gilbert	civil rights leader; as president of Savannah Chapter of NAACP, helped initiate hiring of Savannah's first African-American police officers with other black city employees (one of first cities in South to do so)	
William Gardner Hale	classical scholar best known as an original teacher on questions of syntax	
Estelle Brown Hamilton	entrepreneur, owned a beauty school in Harlem in the 1910s and 1920s	
Brittany Hatch	contestant on America's Next Top Model, season 8	
W. W. Law	civil rights leader; influential in establishment of Ralph Mark Gilbert Civil Rights Museum, King-Tisdell Cottage Museum, Beach Institute of African American Culture, and Negro Heritage Trail Tour	
Jack Leigh	photographer best known for the "Bird Girl" statue photograph on the cover of the non-fiction book Midnight in the Garden of Good and Evil	
Juliette Gordon Low	founder of Girl Scouts of the USA	
E. Coppée Mitchell (1836–1887)	professor and dean of the University of Pennsylvania Law School	
William Pleasant, Jr.	painter and activist	
Quando Rondo	rapper, singer and songwriter	
Sonny Seiler	owner of the University of Georgia mascot Uga and featured in the film Midnight in the Garden of Good and Evil, directed by Clint Eastwood	
Kirk Varnedoe	art historian and curator of painting and sculpture at the New York City Museum of Modern Art	
Akintunde Warnock	comedian	
Frank Wills	security guard at Watergate break-in	
Ellen Axson Wilson	first wife of Woodrow Wilson and First Lady of the United States from 1913 until her death	
Rufus Youngblood	bodyguard to Lyndon B. Johnson at the assassination of John F. Kennedy in Dallas, Texas; resided in later years and died in Savannah	

== Current notable residents (non-natives) ==
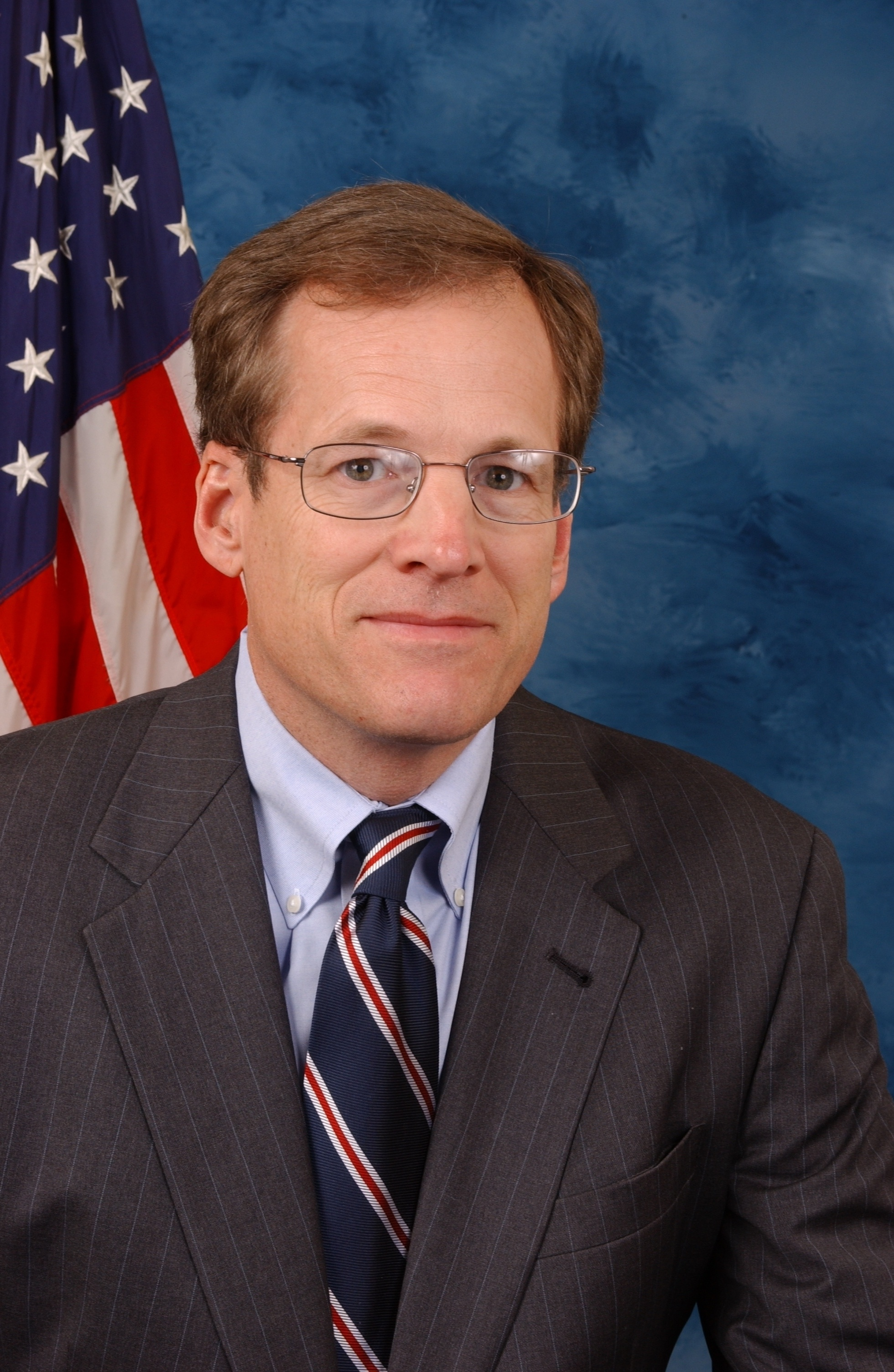
Official U.S. House of Representatives photo of Representative Jack Kingston

Name	Notability	References
Bertice Berry	sociologist, author, former host of nationally syndicated The Bertice Berry Show (1993–1994)	
Paula Deen	restaurateur and host of the former Food Network show Paula's Home Cooking	
Gregory Keyes	author and educator	
Jack Kingston	member of U.S. House of Representatives 1993–2015, representing Georgia's 1st congressional district	
Patricia Lockwood	writer	
Dr. Earl G. Yarbrough	former president of Savannah State University	

== Former notable residents (non-natives) ==
Name	Notability	References
John Berendt	Author of the best-selling non-fiction book Midnight in the Garden of Good and Evil, which is set in Savannah	
The Lady Chablis	transsexual entertainer featured in John Berendt's book Midnight in the Garden of Good and Evil and in the film of the same name directed by Clint Eastwood	
Mike Chaplin	British artist (1943–2026). Spent his last years and died in Savannah	
Danny!	recording artist for Okayplayer Records, former student of the Savannah College of Art & Design	
Mills Lane	professional boxing referee and television court show judge (Judge Mills Lane)	
Lowell Mason	church musician, composer, and music educator	
Phoebe Pember	in charge of housekeeping and patient diet at one of the divisions of Chimborazo Hospital at Richmond, Virginia, during the American Civil War	
Billy Joe Royal	1960s singer	
Jack Sherman	former guitarist with Red Hot Chili Peppers, later played with Bob Dylan and John Hiatt	
John Wesley	Anglican minister and Christian theologian; early leader in the Methodist movement	
Eli Whitney	inventor of the modern cotton gin	
James Williams	antiques dealer, historic preservationist, prosecuted for the murder of Danny Hansford, as featured in Midnight in the Garden of Good and Evil	
Wylly Folk St. John	journalist and novelist, wrote mostly children's books, grew up in Savannah but was born in South Carolina	

== See also ==
- Dorothy Barnes Pelote Bridge
- Earl T. Shinhoster Interchange
- List of mayors of Savannah, Georgia
- List of Savannah College of Art and Design people
