= Mercer County Community College =

Community college in New Jersey, U.S.

Coordinates: 40.254°N 74.653°W

- Type: Public community college
- Established: 1966
- Accreditation: Middle States Commission on Higher Education
- President: Deborah E. Preston
- Faculty: 226 (FTE, 2024)
- Total staff: 589 (FTE, 2024)
- Students: Approx. 9,000
- Location: West Windsor; Trenton
- Colors: Green and gold
- Nickname: Mustangs
- Sporting affiliations: NJCAA – Region 19, Garden State Athletic Conference
- Mascot: Maverick the Mustang
- Website: www.mccc.edu

Mercer County Community College (MCCC or Mercer) is a public community college in Mercer County, in the U.S. state of New Jersey. It offers various associate degree programs as well as online, general education, and English as a second language courses. The college operates campuses in the cities of West Windsor and Trenton, and enrolls approximately 9,000 students.

Mercer County Community College maintains an open admission policy. Its 292-acre (118 ha) West Windsor Campus opened in 1972, while the James Kerney Campus in downtown Trenton offers programming to the city's population. It also operates the Mercer County Fire Academy at the Dempster Fire Training Center in Lawrenceville. The college's associate degree programs include transfer-focused two-year programs as well as career-preparatory programs. Special programs include the DREAM Program for inclusive special-needs education and the college's honors program.

== History ==
The college was formally founded in 1966, though a drawing school has existed in Trenton since at least 1890. A predecessor to the modern community college, the Trenton School of Technical Science and Art, opened in 1898. For the 1901–1902 academic year, the school was renamed to the School of Industrial Arts and operated from Trenton's Union Library.

In 1947, the Trenton Junior College and School of Industrial Arts (TJC) was formed, and in the 1950s it gained authorization to confer Associate of Arts and Science degrees. The Middle States Association fully accredited the college in 1962. In 1966, TJC merged with the existing MCCC to form the current institution.

== Academics ==
The college offers two-year associate degree programs designed for students who aim to transfer to four-year colleges and complete their bachelor's degree. MCCC also offers associate degree programs in applied science designed for students seeking employment after their time at the college. These programs include degrees in accounting, electronics, horticulture, funeral service, and computer graphics.

Non-degree programs include certificates in over 30 different areas, adult education classes for those seeking a high school–equivalent diploma, and an English as a second language program. Students can also take courses on-campus at MCCC that fulfill the requirements for degrees awarded by Rutgers University and William Paterson University. For example, the Rutgers Statewide partnership program allows students to continue taking courses at Mercer County Community College after receiving their associate degree and receive a bachelor's degree from Rutgers after fulfilling the university's requirements.

These on-campus programs are offered through the University Center; in 2018, ground was broken to build the center. In 2020, the University Center offered bachelor's programs with Felician University and Rutgers, as well as bachelor's and master's from Fairleigh Dickinson University, William Paterson, and Wilmington University.

=== Accreditation ===
The college is accredited by the Middle States Commission on Higher Education and approved to offer degree programs by the New Jersey Office of the Secretary of Higher Education. Some of the college's programs are further programmatically accredited.

Programmatic accreditation
Program	Accreditor	Notes
Nursing	Accreditation Commission for Education in Nursing	
Funeral service	American Board of Funeral Service Education	
Physical therapist assistant	American Physical Therapy Association	
Radiography	Joint Review Committee on Education in Radiologic Technology	
Montessori teacher education	Montessori Accreditation Council for Teacher Education	
Medical laboratory technician	National Accrediting Agency for Clinical Laboratory Sciences	
Paralegal	American Bar Association	
Aviation flight technology	Aviation Accreditation Board International	

=== Honors program ===
Established in 2006, the Mercer Honors Program is an honors pathway available to students matriculated into a degree program. Honors students take honors courses each semester that prepare them for upper-division coursework they may encounter after transferring. These courses are smaller and more discussion-based, but intentionally challenging. The program also hosts an annual student-led honors conference; the 2019 conference was on the topic of challenges faced by millennials.

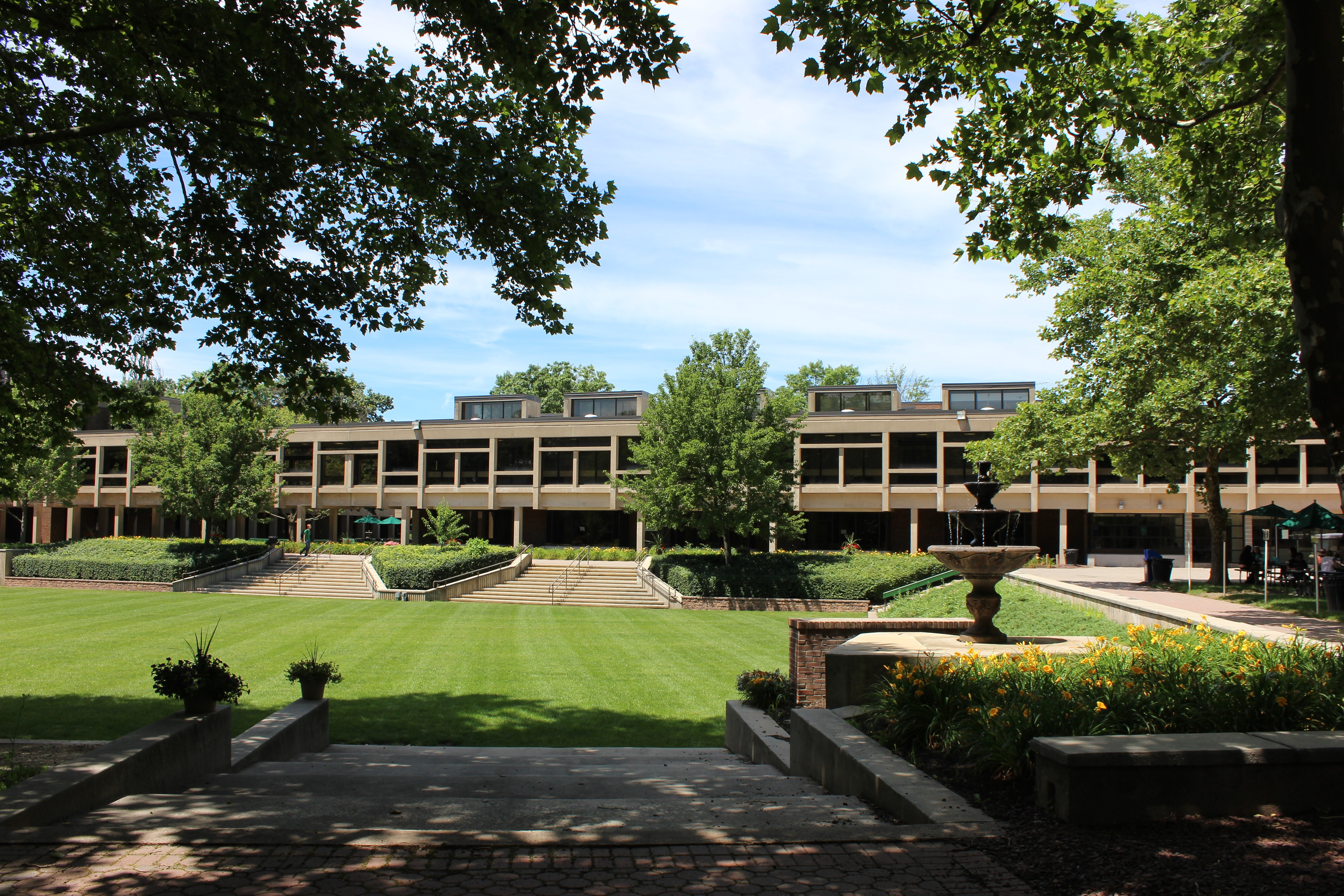
The Quad in 2014

=== DREAM Program ===
In 2005, Mercer and The College of New Jersey split a $300,000 grant from Laura and Steve Riggio, chief executive of Barnes & Noble, to develop programs for students with cognitive disabilities. The couple at the time had a college-age child with Down syndrome.

The college now offers a program through their Center for Accessibility Resources to offer postsecondary education to those with intellectual disabilities. The four-semester DREAM (Developing Real Expectations for Achieving Mastery) Program includes program-specific courses as well as inclusive classes alongside other students.

=== High school partnerships ===
Through concurrent enrollment programs, high school students may take credit-bearing courses at the community college. For the Jump Start Program, students must have completed tenth grade or the equivalent and place into the program through SAT or ACT scores. The Dual Enrollment Program, meanwhile, is available only to high school seniors (and juniors at specific high schools) who take courses that can then be applied to further college education after high school graduation. Jump Start is capped at two courses per term, while Dual Enrollment students may take up to 12 credits per year.

Career Prep, offered in partnership with Mercer County Technical Schools (MCTS), is another high school program for students in the county. Eligible 12th grade students take courses at the West Windsor Campus during the afternoon session and receive credit towards their high school graduation that can also be transferred to other colleges. Students take two classes in the spring and two in the fall, typically resulting in 12 credits in an academic year. Courses are available in the fields of aviation, criminal justice, culinary arts, fashion (at the Kerney Campus), fire science (at the Dempster Fire Training Center), journalism, manufacturing, marketing, and theater, among others.

=== Transfer destinations ===
Formerly known as Dual Admissions, the Guaranteed Transfer Admission program at MCCC allows for the college's students to be guaranteed admission to specific four-year colleges and universities should they meet coursework and GPA requirements. Mercer has established guaranteed transfer agreements with the following institutions: Fairleigh Dickinson University, Georgian Court University, New Jersey City University, New Jersey Institute of Technology, Rider University, Rowan University, Rutgers University, Stockton University, and William Paterson University in New Jersey, and Delaware Valley University, James Madison University, La Salle University, Temple University, and Wilmington University out of state.

Two years after Princeton University, an Ivy League university in Princeton, New Jersey, began accepting transfers, two students from the Mercer County Community College class of 2020 transferred to the university. Princeton published on their website in 2024 a news story of another transfer from MCCC. Princeton University has launched initiatives to attract qualified community college transfer students; the New Jersey Education Association gave Mercer County Community College as an example of a targeted college.

Transfer destinations of honors program alumni include Case Western Reserve University, Columbia University, Harvard University, Princeton, and Washington University in St. Louis. Former editors-in-chief of the college's student newspaper have also transferred to Stanford University, Columbia, Hampshire College, and Princeton.

== Student body ==
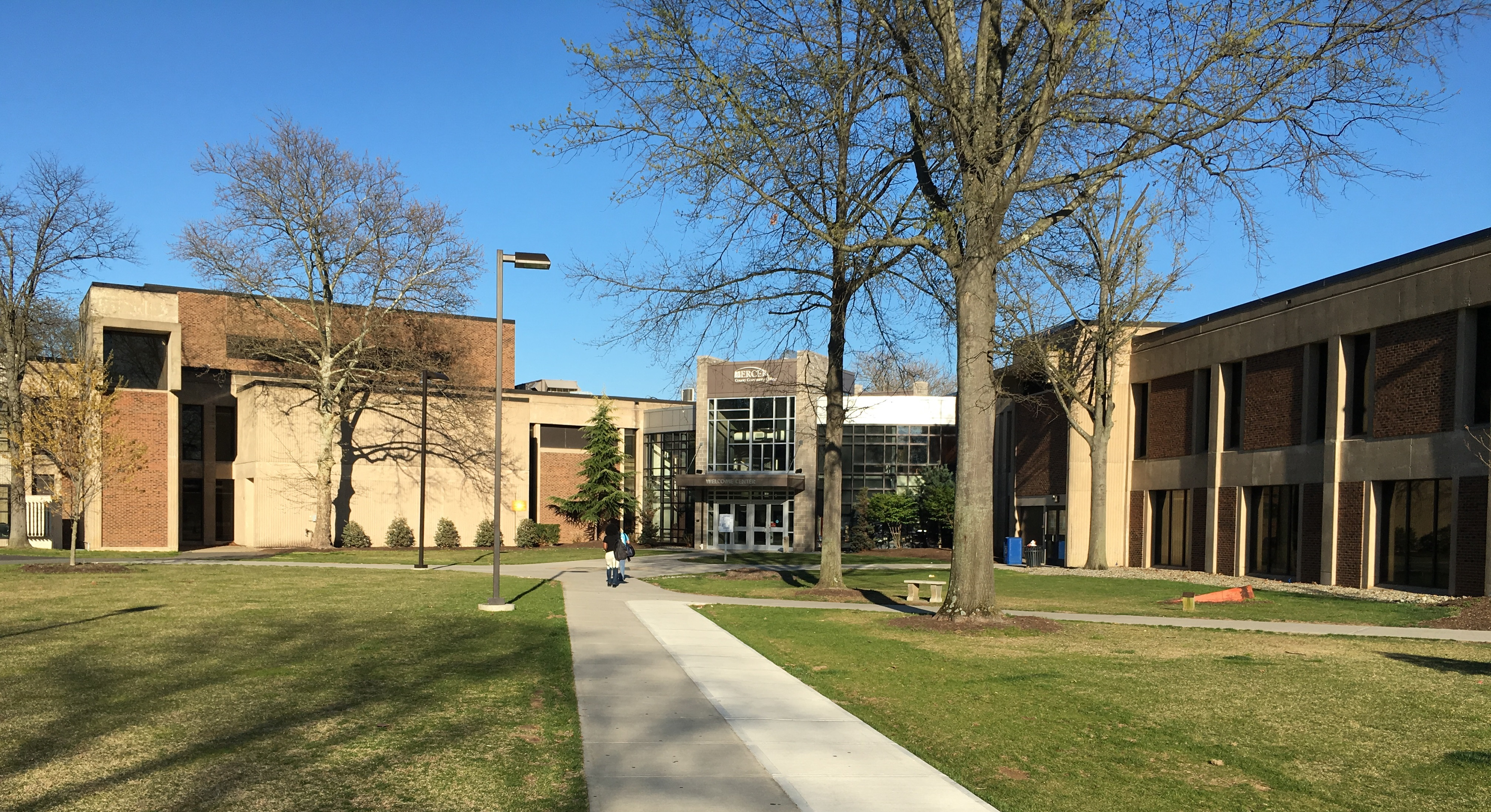
The Student Center, Welcome Center, and Library in 2016

MCCC is an open enrollment college with around 9,000 students enrolling in at least one course each year; three quarters of the student body are local to Mercer County. 67% of students are part-time, while the remaining 33% are enrolled full-time, as of 2023. The gender is split 54% female to 46% male. White students are 31% of the college population.

== Campus life ==
The West Windsor Campus of Mercer County Community College is located on 292 acres (118 ha) in West Windsor, Mercer County. The James Kerney Campus is located in the downtown of Trenton, New Jersey.

=== Student media ===
==== Newspaper ====
Founded in 1968, The College Voice, stylized as The College VOICE, is the student newspaper of MCCC. Print editions are typically published three times per semester. In the spring of 2008, professor Holly Johnson revived the paper from its dormancy of over four years. As of 2020, the Voice has won over 100 awards from the New Jersey Press Association, five awards from the Associated Collegiate Press, 2 College Media Association Apple Awards and 38 Mark of Excellence awards from the Society of Professional Journalists (SPJ). These accolades include Best All-Around Non-Daily Student Newspaper in the two-year college category at the 2010 SPJ Mark of Excellence Awards and small college finalist designation in three categories at the 2018 SPJ Region 1 Mark of Excellence Awards. Other local newspapers have faced staffing cuts since the 2000s, so The College Voice, with an editorial board of four members as of 2020, prides itself on continuing to flourish.

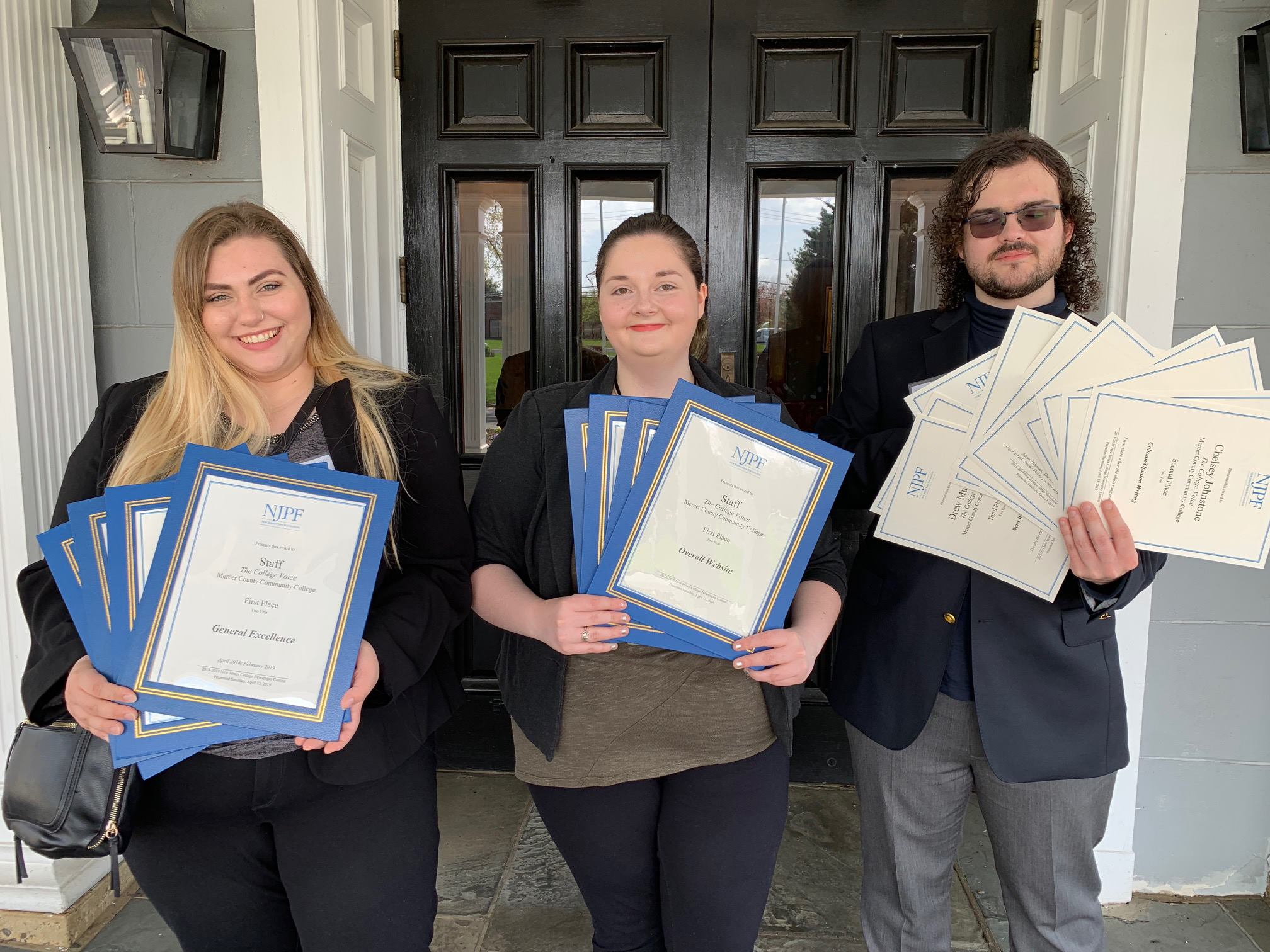
Students from The College Voice won 18 awards from the New Jersey Press Foundation in 2019

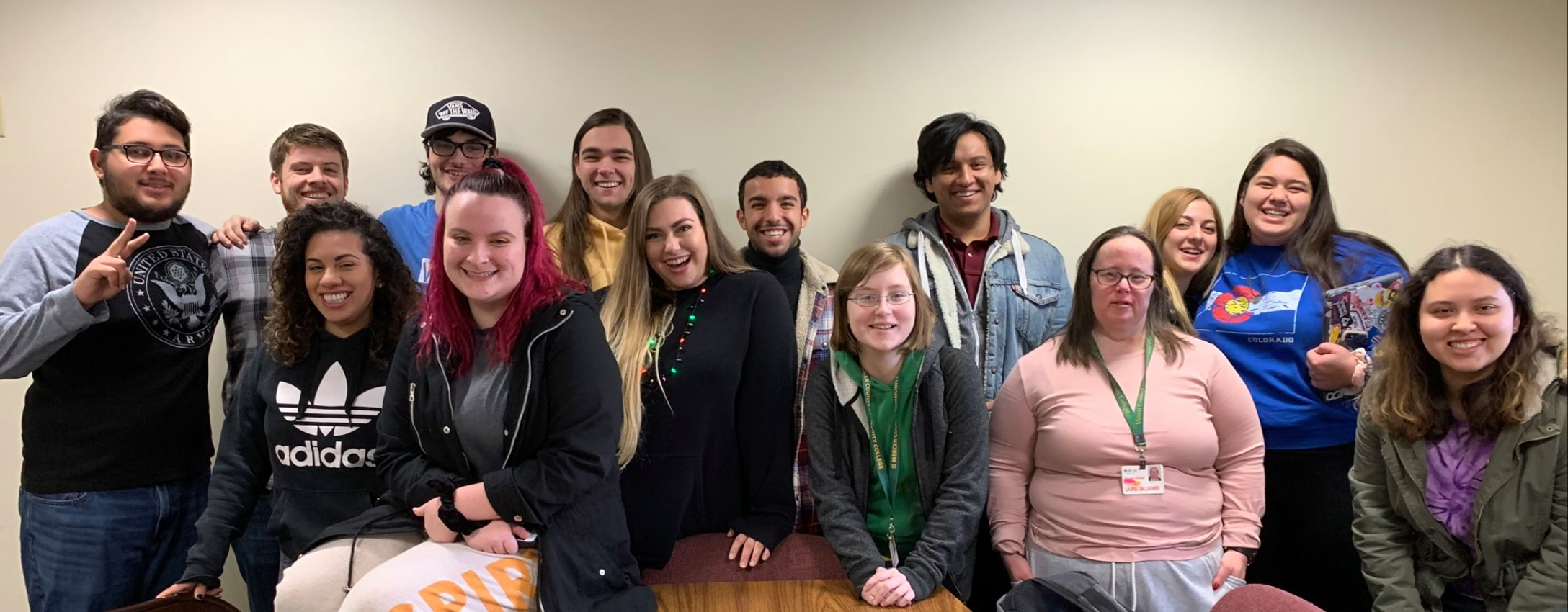
The newspaper staff of Mercer County Community College mirrors the diversity of the campus population

By the New Jersey Press Association in 2019, The College Voice was awarded Best Overall Website. The newspaper became "digital-first" in 2023.

Any Mercer student can write for The College Voice. Alumni of the Voice have found employment at The New York Times, The Boston Globe, NBC News, Sports Illustrated, and ESPN.

==== Broadcast ====
Mercer County Television (MCTV 26) is the college's cable television station. It is cablecast to Mercer County viewers on Cablevision channel 80, Comcast channel 26, or Verizon FiOS channel 20. The college's Associate in Applied Science program in television includes the real-world experiences of creating features and other content for MCTV.

WWFM: The Classical Network is a radio station licensed to Mercer County Community College that broadcasts on 89.1 (HD 1 and 2) from the West Windsor Campus. Their largest source of revenue is listener donations, but the station is also funded by grants from the Corporation for Public Broadcasting. The HD1 channel, The Classical Network, broadcasts an all-classical format, while HD2 is all-jazz and named JazzOn2. The ASCAP Foundation honored The Classical Network with a Deems Taylor/Virgil Thomson Radio Broadcast Award in 2014.

=== Performing arts ===
The Kelsey Theatre is a 385-seat on-campus arts venue at the West Windsor Campus. It hosts theatre productions by on-campus groups, as well as arts events for and by the wider community. Full-length productions have been shown at Kelsey since at least the 1973–1974 season. Associate in Arts (designed for transfers) and Associate in Fine Arts degree programs in acting, theatre, and speech are offered at the college. There exist also ten different theatre companies based at the Kelsey Theatre as of 2026.

Desires of a Criminal, a Devised Theatrical Collage, an original MCCC play, was selected to appear in the 2020 Kennedy Center American College Theatre Festival.

=== Residential life ===
Mercer County Community College students may live in the on-campus housing at either Rider University in Lawrenceville, New Jersey, or The College of New Jersey (TCNJ) in Ewing. MCCC students living at Rider have access to that campus' library and health center and may enroll in a meal plan there. Similarly, Mercer students living on the TCNJ campus are able to join student organizations and access dining facilities at the college.

== Athletics ==
Mercer is a member of the Garden State Athletic Conference, a conference in Region 19 of the National Junior College Athletic Association. Its teams are represented by Maverick the Mustang and nicknamed the Mercer Mustangs, but were formerly known as the Mercer Vikings. Their colors are green and gold. The college fields teams in baseball, men's and women's basketball, women's cross country, men's and women's soccer, softball, men's lacrosse, and men's and women's tennis.

Three teams, baseball, softball, and men's soccer, won Region 19 championships in the 2017–2018 season. In 2018, MCCC added a men's lacrosse team that took the Region 19 championship in its first season of play. The Mustangs (then Vikings) have sent several players to Major League Baseball, including Dave Gallagher, Dan Gakeler, and Heath Fillmyer, as well as to Minor League Baseball with players such as James Pugliese.

== Administration and faculty ==
Mercer is a member of the New Jersey Council of County Colleges. The president of Mercer County Community College, as of 2026, is Deborah E. Preston, Ph.D.

The college employs 589 full-time equivalent (FTE) staff, of which 226 FTE are instructional staff. The student–faculty ratio is 16:1.

== Notable alumni ==
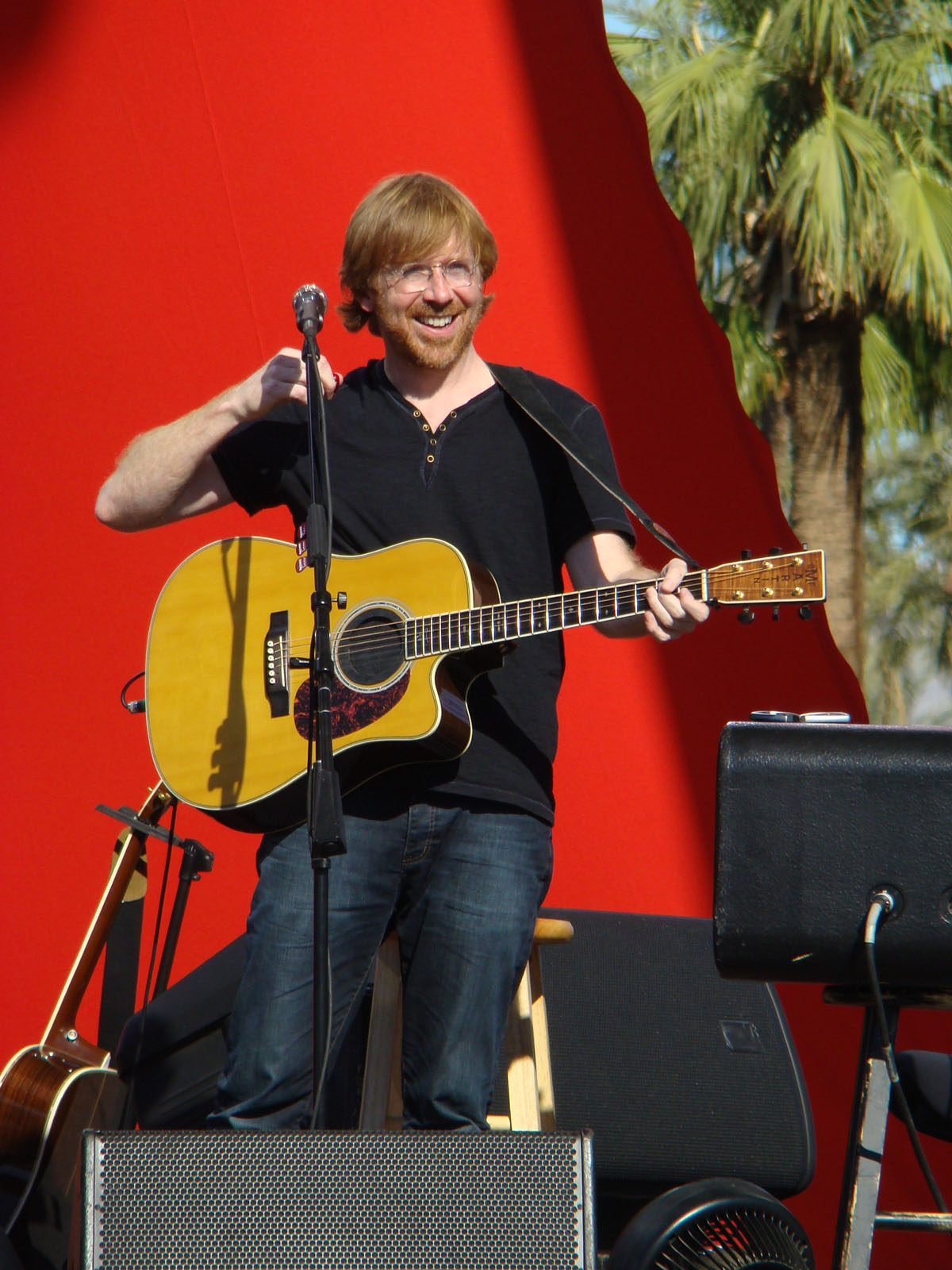
- Anastasio playing an acoustic set in 2009
  Trey Anastasio (born 1964), founder, lead singer, and guitarist for Phish
- Antron Brown (born 1976), Top Fuel champion drag racer
- Heath Fillmyer (born 1994), Major League Baseball pitcher
- Dan Gakeler (born 1964), Major League Baseball pitcher
- Dave Gallagher (born 1960), Major League Baseball outfielder
- Alejandro Hernandez (born c. 1990), actor who appeared in New Amsterdam and The Horror of Dolores Roach
- Stern John (born 1976), Trinidadian soccer player and manager of Central F.C.
- Daouda Kanté (born 1978), Malian Major League Soccer player
- Doug Mastriano (born 1964), politician in the Pennsylvania State Senate
- Kenneth R. Rosen (born 1990), reporter for The New York Times
- Evans Wise (born 1973), Trinidadian soccer player in the 2006 FIFA World Cup
