= Rashaad =

Rashaad is a given name. Notable people with the name include:

- Rashaad Carter (born 1989), American football wide receiver
- Jamaal RaShaad Jones Charles (born 1986), former American football running back
- Rashaad Coward (born 1994), American football defensive tackle
- Rashaad Duncan (born 1986), former American football defensive tackle
- Rashaad Galant (1947–2014), South African cricketer
- Rashaad Magiet (born 1979), South African cricketer
- Joshua Rashaad McFadden, American visual artist and photographer
- Rashaad Mosweu (born 1998), Botswana cricketer
- Rashaad Newsome (born 1979), American artist
- Rashaad Penny (born 1996), American football running back
- Rashaad Powell (born 1981), American basketball coach and former player
- Rashaad Reynolds (born 1991), American football cornerback
- Rashaad Singleton (born 1987), American basketball player

== See also ==
- Rachaad White (born 1999), American football running back
- Rashad
- Rasheeda
- Rashid (disambiguation)
