= Akinleye =

- Gender: Male

Origin
- Language: Yoruba
- Origin: Nigerian
- Meaning: Valor is honorable
- Region of origin: South-West Nigeria

Other names
- Short form: Akin

Akinlẹ̀yẹ audio is a Yoruba surname meaning "Valor is honorable", it can also be translated to mean "being brave is honorable.

== Notable people bearing the name ==
- Akintunde Akinleye, Nigerian photojournalist
- Johnson O. Akinleye
