= Sleepless Domain =

Webcomic and graphic novel series

- Cover of the first print volume, featuring Undine (center) surrounded by her teammates
- Author: Mary Cagle
- Website: http://www.sleeplessdomain.com/
- Current status/schedule: Inactive
- Launch date: April 6, 2015
- Publishers: Hiveworks (web); Hachette (print); Seven Seas (print)
- Genre: Magical girl
- Original language: English
- Rating: Teen (13+)

Sleepless Domain is an ongoing American webcomic and graphic novel series created by Mary Cagle. It has been serialized online since April 6, 2015, with its chapters collected into two print volumes as of 2024. The series is set in a secluded city perpetually threatened by monsters, where young women known as magical girls are tasked with defending the population. The story centers on Undine Wells, a reserved member of a popular magical girl team, who struggles to move forward after a devastating attack leaves her as the sole survivor of her team.

The comic has received praise for its character development, subversion of traditional magical girl tropes, and exploration of complex themes such as grief and trauma. Sleepless Domain has been nominated for the Cartoonist Studio Prize, and has been published in print in both English and French.

== Synopsis ==
=== Setting ===
Sleepless Domain is set in a nameless and isolated city that is regularly besieged by monsters. During the day, the city is protected by a magical barrier that prevents the monsters from entering. However, each night between 10:00 p.m. and 2:00 a.m., this barrier is lowered, and the monsters are free to roam the city. In order to protect citizens during these hours, the city is home to a large number of magical girls, young women who are granted magical powers to combat the monsters.

Within the city, magical girls are regarded by the public as celebrities. Popular magical girls are often followed by camera crews while on duty and have their fights televised during the day. Many magical girls choose to monetize their popularity through sponsorships, brand deals, and officially licensed merchandise. Magical girls are also encouraged, though not required, to register with the Board of Magical Girls, a government agency that oversees magical girl activity within the city. The city provides various benefits to girls who choose to register, including access to counseling and admission to the exclusive Future's Promise School for Magical Girls.

=== Plot ===
The story initially follows Team Alchemical, an established group of five magical girls themed after the classical elements. The team is led by Tessa Quinn/Alchemical Aether, the most powerful member of the group; the other members of the team include Undine Wells/Alchemical Water, Sylvia Skylark/Alchemical Air, Sally Fintan/Alchemical Fire and Gwen Morita/Alchemical Earth. During a night patrol while Tessa is absent, the team is ambushed by a powerful monster, resulting in the deaths of Sylvia, Sally, and Gwen. Tessa sacrifices her powers in order to save Undine's life, leaving Undine as the sole surviving member of the team. Following the tragedy, Undine is left to cope with the loss of her friends. At Tessa's urging, she begins to looks for a new team to join, initially to no avail. At the same time, Undine attempts to investigate the circumstances of the attack that killed her friends.

=== Characters ===
Undine Wells / Alchemical Water
Undine Wells is the main protagonist of the series and a magical girl with the ability to manipulate water. She is portrayed as soft-spoken and compassionate, always willing to help others, often at the expense of her own well-being. Originally a member of Team Alchemical, Undine grapples with self-doubt and survivor's guilt after a monster attack leaves her as the sole survivor of her team. She is reserved and introverted, often bottling up her emotions to focus on her duties and avoid confronting her trauma. Over time, she forms a bond and eventual romantic relationship with Heartful Punch, another magical girl who supports her through her grief and recovery.

Heartful Punch / Kokoro Aichi
Heartful Punch (HP) is a popular magical girl within the city, who has achieved success despite choosing to work independently rather than join a team. She is energetic and outgoing, and is passionate about helping others. She supports Undine after the loss of her team, helping her rebuild her confidence and forming a close friendship that gradually develops into a romantic partnership. HP eventually reveals that her powers were inherited from her mother, a former magical girl who lost her powers after giving birth. This loss left her unable to protect her family from a monster attack that ultimately killed her and her parents.

Tessa Quinn / Alchemical Aether
Tessa Quinn is the former leader of Team Alchemical. A major character in the story, she is Undine's best friend and later her rival. Initially, she appears as a strong and assertive magical girl with the ability to manipulate raw magical energy. After choosing to sit out a patrol, Tessa's team is attacked by a powerful monster, resulting in the deaths of three of her teammates. The fourth, Undine, is mortally wounded when Tessa arrives, forcing her to sacrifice her own powers to save Undine's life. Without her powers, Tessa transfers from Future's Promise to a public school. Though she manages to make a few friends, however, after the tragedy of that day, she began to feel guilty towards her former teammates, and was driven to the brink by a complex web of emotions, various events, and despair. Then, a month after the tragic deaths of her three teammates, the guilt and depression she had felt since that day, combined with the whispers from the Goops, caused Tessa to change completely into a cold-hearted person.

Zoe Blecher
Zoe Blecher is a new magical girl who has gained her powers shortly before the start of the series. She has long aspired to become a magical girl but now struggles with the pressures and expectations associated with the role.

Rue Bahia
Rue Bahia is an unregistered magical girl who attends the same public school as Tessa. She is cynical and rebellious, and critical of the city's treatment of magical girls.

== Production ==
=== Development ===
Sleepless Domain was initially conceived in 2012 by Mary Cagle, previously known for her webcomic Kiwi Blitz. While initially pitched as a "magical girl elimination reality show" similar to Survivor, the final comic deviated significantly from this concept. Cagle has cited Puella Magi Madoka Magica as an influence on the comic's themes, but also expressed a desire to explore the idea of recovery and moving on from tragedy.

The comic was publicly announced on July 29, 2014, under the working title Umbra Rising. Following further development, it was rebranded as Sleepless Domain in order to better align with the series' concept.

The first page of the comic was officially published online on April 6, 2015. Initially, Oscar Vega was the primary artist, but after his departure from Hiveworks in late 2015, Mary Cagle assumed both writing and artistic duties, accompanied by a shift in the visual style of the comic. Starting in early 2021, Cagle has also worked with background artists to assist with the comic's art.

=== Publication history ===
The webcomic has been serialized online since its debut in 2015. In 2018, Hachette Livre began publishing a French-language print edition of the comic. Seven Seas Entertainment followed with an English print edition and ebook release in 2021. The print editions also include additional concept art and commentary not available in the webcomic.

== Reception ==
=== Critical reception ===
Sleepless Domain has been recognized by critics for its innovative take on the magical girl genre and its exploration of complex themes including grief and trauma. The comic's art style has also been highlighted for the contrast between its "cute" aesthetic and the more mature themes that the story addresses. Publishers Weekly called the series a "sinister flip side to the oft-sweet magical girl genre," and praised its exploration of survivor's guilt, power dynamics, and exploitation. Kotaku also noted the contrast between its light-hearted art style and its somber themes, describing it as a tragic story about "loss of fellowship." Sleepless Domain was included in CBR's Top 100 Comics of 2022, which highlighted the comic's art and character work.

Sleepless Domain has also been noted for its positive LGBTQ+ representation and themes. The queer magazine INTO included Sleepless Domain in its list of "10 Fabulous LGBTQ+ Magical Girl Comics for Queer Readers," noting the comic's unique premise and its handling of sensitive topics. Dahlia Adler's LGBTQ Reads also recommended the comic for its LGBTQ-friendly world and characters, calling it "refreshing" that the characters' LGBTQ+ identities are accepted and normalized within the story.

Sleepless Domain has been compared to other magical girl series that feature dark themes, including Puella Magi Madoka Magica, Magical Girl Raising Project, and Yuki Yuna is a Hero. ComicsXF compared Sleepless Domain favorably to other dark magical girl stories regarding its portrayal of sensitive topics, noting that rather than glamorizing the characters' trauma, the comic emphasizes healthy coping mechanisms and the importance of finding support. Another critic described the series' tone as being "very much informed by" more deconstructive magical girl series while at the same time "not trying to be one. It's set in a world where bad stuff happens, but it resists the urge to be grim and chooses to be genuine and heartfelt instead."

=== Awards and nominations ===
In 2019, Sleepless Domain was shortlisted for the eighth Cartoonist Studio Prize for Best Web Comic.
