= Meredith Pardue =

American abstract painter (born 1975)

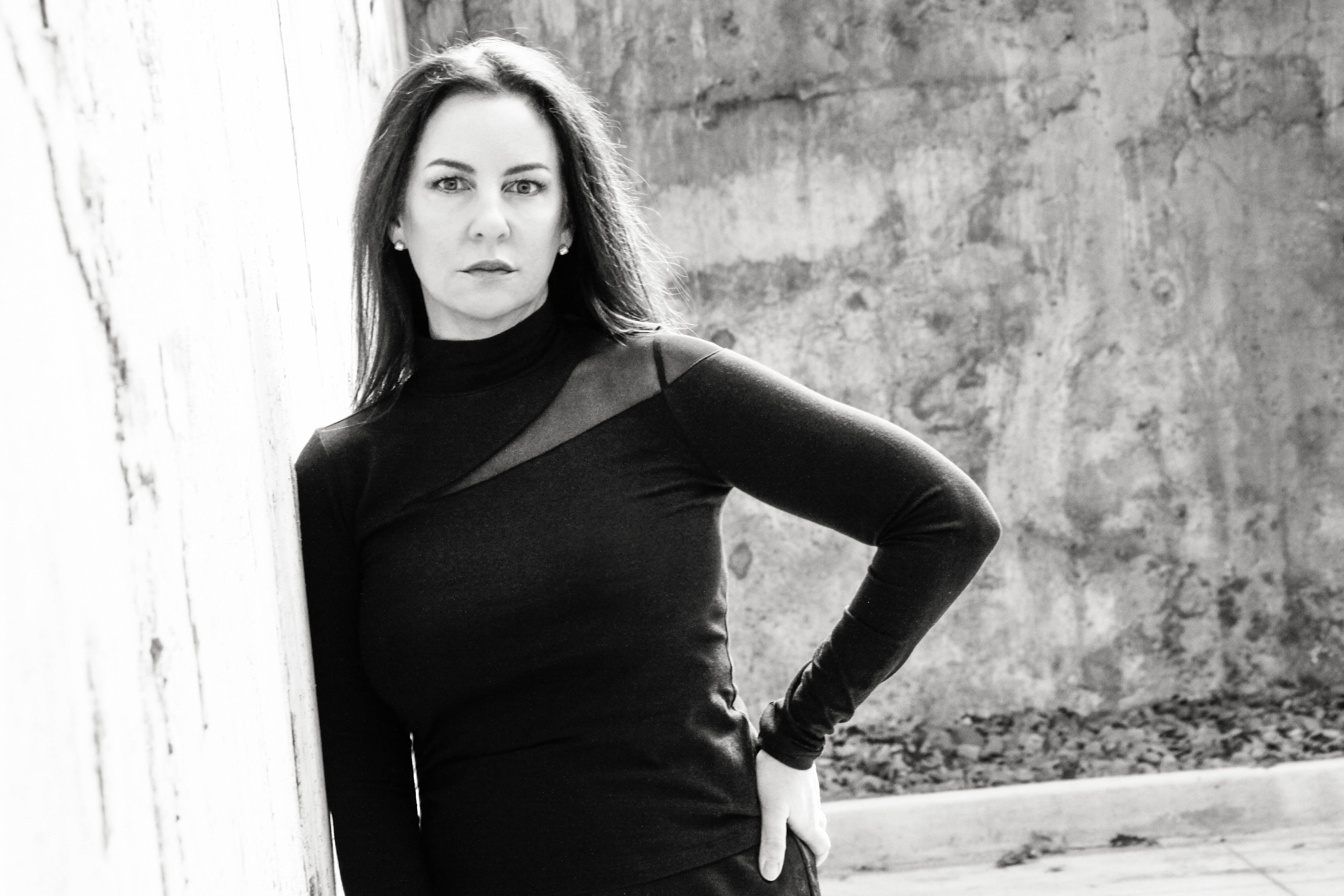
- Born: November 22, 1975 (age 50); Monroe, Louisiana
- Education: Savannah College of Art and Design; Parsons School of Design
- Occupation: Artist
- Website: www.meredithpardue.com

Meredith Pardue is an American contemporary abstract painter.

== Early life and education ==
Meredith Pardue was born in Monroe, Louisiana November 22, 1975. She earned a B.F.A. in painting with a minor in art history from the Savannah College of Art and Design in 1998, and an M.F.A. in painting from Parsons School of Design in 2003. She also taught painting and figure drawing at Parsons during her graduate program.

In 2003, Pardue began teaching both studio and art history courses at University of Louisiana at Monroe in the Department of Fine Arts. In 2006 she left the teaching to devote herself entirely to the cultivation of her work and the advancement of her fine art career.

== Career ==
Pardue has been featured in solo and group exhibitions throughout the United States, England, Singapore, and France. She has also shown at various art fairs, including Art Miami and CONTEXT. In 2022, Pardue celebrated her 50th solo exhibition. Her work has also been included in notable private and corporate collections, including in the SCAD Fash Museum, J. Crew, Norwegian Cruise Lines, Ritz Carlton, University of Texas at Austin. Her work has been published in art periodicals including the Southern Review, New American Paintings, Elle Decoration, and Architectural Digest and featured in productions of CBS Studios, CBS News Productions, DreamWorks, Echo Films, and FilmNation.

Galleries that have represented her work include Ann Connelly Fine Art in Baton Rouge, Bryant Street Gallery in Palo Alto, Chicago Art Source in Chicago, Cube Gallery in London, District Gallery in Ohio, Fresh Paint Contemporary in Los Angeles, Galerie Got in Paris, Gardner Colby Gallery in Naples, Gruen Galleries in Chicago, Julie Nester in Park City, Kathryn Markel Fine Arts in New York City, Kelsey Michaels Fine Art in Laguna Beach, Laura Rathe Fine Art in Dallas and Houston, Merritt Gallery in Baltimore, Chevy Chase and Haverford, and Ode to Art in Singapore.

In 2015, a book about her work was published entitled Paint.

== Work ==
Pardue is a contemporary abstract painter known for her mixed-media works, which blend layers of acrylic, ink, and oil. Throughout her career, Pardue has lived in cities such as Austin, Portland, Savannah, and New York City, each of which shaped her artistic expression. She draws inspiration from the landscapes and cultures of these places, as well as her travels along the U.S. coastlines, France, and the Caribbean, all of which are reflected in the rich textures and forms of her paintings.

Pardue has stated that her paintings "evoke botanical or geological elements, but these elements serve merely as a point of departure for the viewer to experience what is ultimately a visual record of an improvisational dialogue between a blank canvas and myself.” Nature is a significant inspiration in her work, and she uses these forms as a point of departure to explore the infinite possibilities of paint within a two dimensional plane.

Pardue also states that her gestural abstract work stems from "universal themes, rather than specific notions of ideas or concepts, so I am less concerned with representation and more with resonance—how color vibrates, how forms evoke a response that is unique, visceral, and universal all at once. These paintings are both a mirror and a journey. They are moments of vulnerability and power, reflecting not only who I am, but who we all are, in our truest states."

== Personal life ==
Pardue is currently based in Austin, Texas. Meredith Pardue is the mother of two sons and one daughter. She is married to Mike Hewett, a realist painter, and the two produce collaborative work under the name Pardue Hewett.
