= Akintunde Akinwande =

Nigerian American engineering professor

Akintunde Ibitayo Akinwande
- Born: Offa, Kwara State, Nigeria
- Citizenship: American
- Education: Obafemi Awolowo University (B.Sc.,M.Sc.); Stanford University (Ph.D.)
- Scientific career
- Fields: Electrical engineering
- Workplaces: MIT

Akintunde Ibitayo Akinwandeaudio is a Nigerian American engineering professor at the Electrical Engineering and Computer Science Department of Massachusetts Institute of Technology. He was appointed as chairman of Nigerian Electricity Regulatory Commission, NERC, and he said he will honour his appointment once he secures permission from his employers.

== Early life and education ==
Akintunde was born in Offa in Kwara State. He attended Government College, Ibadan. He earned his B.Sc. (1978), M.Sc. (1981) in electrical and electronic engineering from the Obafemi Awolowo University in Ile-Ife and Ph.D. (1986) in electrical engineering from Stanford University, California.

== Academic and career ==
Akinwande commenced work as a scientist at Honeywell Inc. Technology Center in Bloomington, Minnesota in 1986, initially researching on Gas Complementary FET technology for very high speed and low power signal processing. He became associate professor at the Department of Electrical Engineering and Computer Science and Microsystems Technology Laboratories (MTL) at Massachusetts Institute of Technology (MIT) in January 1995, researching on pressure sensors, accelerometers, thin-film field emission and display devices, micro-fabrication and electronic devices with particular emphasis on smart sensors and actuators, intelligent displays, large area electronics (macro-electronics) and field ionization devices, mass spectrometry and electric propulsion. He developed the thin-film-edge Field Emitter Arrays for RF Micro-Triode Power Amplifiers and Flat Panel Displays, demonstrating the possible use of the thin-film-edge.

His research also focuses on:

- Microstructures and nanostructures for sensors and actuators, and vacuum microelectronics.
- Devices for large-area electronics and flat panel displays
- Lithographically patterned metal oxide transistors for large-area electronics
- CNT-based open architecture ionizer for portable mass spectrometry
- Growth studies of in-plane and out-of-plane SWNTs for electron devices
- High-current CNT FEAs on Si Pillars
- Batch-fabricated linear quadrupole mass filters

He co-founded the Nigeria Higher Education Foundation in 2004. He has served in technical program committees for various conferences such as:

- Device Research Conference,
- the International Electron Devices Meeting,
- the International Solid-State Circuits Conference,
- the International Display Research Conference
- the International Vacuum Microelectronics Conference.

== Academic posts and memberships ==
- Visiting professor at the Cambridge University Engineering Department
- Overseas Fellow of Churchill College from 2002 to 2003.
- Member of the IEEE Nanotechnology Council.

== Honours and awards ==
- Sweatt Award Honeywell's Technical Award (1989)
- National Science Foundation (NSF) Career Award.(1996)
- Fellow Class of 2008 IEEE

== Publications ==
He has authored over 100 journals and publications.

== Patents ==
- Numerous patents in MEMS, Electronics on Flexible Substrates, Display.
- Single-use, permanently sealable microvalve.
- Diaphragm phased field emitter and backfilling method for producing a microstructure.
- Individually switched field emission arrays.
- Organic field emission device.
