= Mary Cagle =

American webcomic artist

- Born: 1 December 1989 (age 36)
- Pseudonym: Cube Watermelon

Mary Cagle, also known as Cube Watermelon, is an American webcomic artist known for creating Kiwi Blitz, Let's Speak English, and Sleepless Domain.

== Personal life ==
Cagle was raised in Corpus Christi, Texas and developed a strong interest in Japanese pop-culture, including both older and more modern anime and video games. In 2013, Cagle graduated from the Savannah College of Art and Design and became an English teacher at an elementary school in Kurihara, Japan. Cagle is asexual.

== Works ==
=== Kiwi Blitz ===
In 2009, Cagle started the action/comedy webcomic Kiwi Blitz. Its plot follows a couple of teenagers attempting to fight crime in the pseudo-near future. Kiwi Blitz draws many of its influences from anime, featuring Americanized Japanese mecha designs. Brian Cronin of Comic Book Resources described the set-up of Kiwi Blitz as a "strong concept" that should be able to sustain itself for a long time. Praising the "interesting" cast, Cronin noted that Cagle is willing to "mix things up" so that story doesn't become stale. Lauren Davis of io9 listed Kiwi Blitz among her top ten superhero webcomics. The comic has been on hiatus since September 2021.

=== Let's Speak English ===
In November 2013, Cagle began illustrating her experiences of being an English teacher in Japan in the form of slice-of-life snippets. The webcomic, titled Let's Speak English, shows Cagle dealing with subjects such as Japanese pop-culture, toilets, thin walls, and the language barrier. It has been compared to the Japanese manga Yotsuba&! due to their shared slice-of-life elements. The comic concluded in 2016, with Mary moving back to America and ending her teaching job.

=== Sleepless Domain ===
Cagle started the webcomic Sleepless Domain in 2015. The story, set in a city that is invaded by malicious monsters on a nightly basis, features a group of magical girls and their interpersonal issues. Hachette began publishing a French-language physical release of the comic in 2018. In 2019, Sleepless Domain was shortlisted for the eighth Cartoonist Studio Prize for Best Web Comic. In 2020, Seven Seas Entertainment announced a print and ebook release of the comic.

In a review of the first collected volume, Publishers Weekly praised the comic for its darker take on the magical girl genre, noting its exploration of themes such as survivor's guilt, power, and exploitation. Kotaku described the comic as a tragic story about "loss of fellowship," also noting that the comic's darker themes are contrasted with Cagle's cute art style. Sleepless Domain was included in CBR's Top 100 Comics of 2022, with Brian Cronin praising the comic for its character work and art.

Sleepless Domain has also been noted for its positive LGBTQ+ representation and themes. The LGBTQ+ culture website INTO included Sleepless Domain in its list of "10 Fabulous LGBTQ+ Magical Girl Comics for Queer Readers," noting the comic's sensitive handling of difficult subject matter and its unique premise. LGBTQ Reads also recommended the comic for its LGBTQ-friendly world and characters, calling it "refreshing" that the characters' LGBTQ+ identities are accepted and normalized within the story.
