= Richard Ayodele Akintunde =

Nigerian lawyer

- Born: 4 November 1964 (age 61); Montreal, Canada
- Occupation: Lawyer
- Years active: 1993—present

Richard Ayodele Akintunde SAN is a Nigerian lawyer and sportsman. In 2016, Akintunde was appointed as a Senior Advocate of Nigeria and is also a Chartered Arbitrator and Fellow of the Chartered Institute of Arbitrators and a past President of the Business Recovery and Insolvency Practitioners Association of Nigeria.

== Early life and education ==
Akintunde was born on 4 November 1964 in Montreal, Canada, to Josiah Olanipekun Akintunde and Florence Oseyemi Akintunde, originally from Ondo Town in Ondo State, Nigeria.

He began his primary education at the Staff School, University of Ife, from 1967 to 1974 before proceeding to Ilesa Grammar School, Osun State from 1975 to 1980, where he obtained his West African School Certificate. Akintude furthered his education at Obafemi Awolowo University, where he graduated with an LLB (Hons.) degree in 1984 and was called to the Bar in 1985.

== Career ==
In June 1993, he became a Founding and Managing Partner of Laniyan, Akintunde & Ibrahim, a commercial law, litigation, and alternative dispute resolution (ADR) firm. In 2004, he established Ayodele Akintunde & Co., a full service firm with offices in Lagos and Abuja, and was appointed as a Senior Advocate of Nigeria (SAN) in 2016.

As of 2024, Akintunde serves as a Senior Partner at Ayodele Akintunde & Co. and is a Chartered Arbitrator and Fellow of the Chartered Institute of Arbitrators and the Business Recovery and Insolvency Practitioners Association of Nigeria. In the Nigerian Bar Association, Akintunde has served as the Chair of the Electoral Committee, election audit and reform committee. He has also served on the Council of the Section on Legal Practice.

== Personal life ==
Akintunde participates in golfing and motorcycling events such as the Three Flags Tour, Saddlestore, Iron Bum Run, and Tough Tour. He is the Bamofin of Ondo Kingdom, the Deputy Chancellor of the Anglican Diocese of Ondo and the Chairman of the Osemawe Youth Empowerment Foundation.
