= Natalia Arias =

British-born photographer

- Born: 1977 (age 48–49); Brighton
- Known for: photography

Natalia Arias is a photographer. She was born in Brighton, United Kingdom in 1977, raised in Bogotá, Colombia and now currently lives and works in Miami, Florida.

== Education ==
She attended Savannah College of Art and Design in 2000, and received her B.F.A in photography from there. In 2002 she attended the portfolio program in Miami Ad School of Graphic Design.

== Awards ==
In 1999 she received the Sean Moran Memorial Scholarship.

== One-person exhibitions ==
Natalia Arias has exhibited various times in and out of the United States.

- 2017 "New Place, New Space," Nohra Haime Gallery, New York City; "People, Places, and Things," Atrium Gallery, Saint Louis, MO; "Feminist Feminine," Nohra Haime Gallery, New York
- 2016 "Fotografias," Museo Rayo, Roldanillo, Colombia; "Introspection: Major Works by Gallery Artists," Nohra Haime Gallery, New York; "100+ Degrees in the Shade: A Survey of South Florida Art," Miami, FL
- 2015 "Class of 2015," Nohra Haime Gallery, New York
- 2014 PULSE Miami Beach, Nohra Haime Gallery, Miami "Femininity Beyond Archetypes: Photography by Natalia Arias," Art Museum of the Americas, Washington D.C.
- 2013 "No Permanent, No Perpetual," Galería Artespacio, Santiago, Chile "News," NH Galeria, Cartagena de Indias, Colombia
- 2012 "No Permanent, No Perpetual," Nohra Haime Gallery, New York
- 2011 "Change," NH Galería, Cartagena de Indias 2010 "Venus," ARTBO, Nohra Haime Gallery, Bogota, Colombia "Goddesses," NEXT, Nohra Haime Gallery, Chicago, IL
- 2006 "Venus," Nohra Haime Gallery, New York
- 2005 "Taboo – Passages," Nohra Haime Gallery, New York
