= Omowale Akintunde =

American academic and film director

- Born: Darrell Lewis
- Occupations: Academic, film director, author
- Employer: University of Nebraska Omaha

Omowale Achebe Akintunde is an African-American academic, film director, and author with an interest in the areas of education, race, and diversity. He is a former chairman of the Department of Black Studies at the University of Nebraska at Omaha and won a regional Emmy award for his short documentary An Inaugural Ride to Freedom.

== Early life and education ==
Omowale Akintunde was born Darrell Lewis and was raised in Mobile, Alabama. He was awarded a scholarship to Alabama State University, where he majored in music education and was a member of the Marching Hornets band. He graduated in 1979.

After teaching music in elementary and high schools and serving in the United States Army, in 1992 Akintunde received a scholarship to study for a master's degree at Alabama State University. He earned a Master of Music Education degree and was awarded a Gus T. Ridgel fellowship to pursue his doctoral studies at the University of Missouri in Columbia. In 1996 he earned a Ph.D. in Curriculum and Instruction and African American Studies, with a dissertation titled "The Effect of Using Rapping to Teach Selected Musical Forms to Urban African-American Middle School Students". While at the University of Missouri, he was inspired by African-American scholar Sunidata Chajua to change his name to Omowale Achebe Akintunde.

In 2007, he graduated from the directing school at the New York Film Academy.

== Academic career ==
Akintunde's first university appointment was as an assistant professor in the College of Education at the University of Wyoming. In 1996, while interim chair of the African-American Studies Department, he co-founded the annual Shepard Symposium on Social Justice. In 2003, he became a professor at the University of Southern Indiana, where he achieved tenure.

He subsequently moved to the University of Nebraska at Omaha, where he was chairman of the Department of Black Studies from 2008 and was on the editorial board of the Journal of the National Association of Multicultural Education. In 2018, he and Manfred Wogugu unsuccessfully sued the University of Nebraska, alleging that a hostile work environment created by the then head of the department and differential treatment of their complaints on the part of the university. He subsequently retired from the university and became a full-time diversity consultant and filmmaker.

In an academic paper, he wrote about racism: "Racism is a systemic, societal, institutional, omnipresent, and epistemologically embedded phenomenon that pervades every vestige of our reality. For most whites, however, racism is like murder: the concept exists, but someone has to commit it in order for it to happen. This limited view of such a multilayered syndrome cultivates the sinister nature of racism and, in fact, perpetuates racist phenomena rather than eradicates them."

== Film career ==
Akintunde's early films include Communion and Mama 'n 'Em, which was selected for the Hollywood Black Filmmaker Festival. In 2009, he reshot his New York Film Academy thesis film, Wigger, as a feature film, relocating it to Omaha. The film, which co-stars Meshach Taylor, explores racism in America through the white teenage son of a racist father whose best friend is Black and who embraces Black culture and seeks to become an R&B singer, wrongly "think[ing] he's transcended his whiteness". Wigger premiered in Omaha in April 2010.

His short documentary An Inaugural Ride to Freedom is based on the experiences and thoughts of a group from the University of Nebraska Black Studies department and members of the Omaha community who took a bus to witness the inauguration of Barack Obama, America's first Black president, in January 2009. Released in 2010, the film won the regional Emmy Award for Best Documentary – Cultural. In 2013, Akintunde produced and directed a second road film commemorating Obama's second inauguration, and his original film was re-broadcast on PBS in honor of the event.

He wrote, produced, directed, and co-starred in a sitcom pilot, It Takes a Village, shown in 2019.

== Writing career ==
His children's book The Adventures of Darrell and the Invincible Man, published in 2007, was nominated for the Outstanding Multicultural Children's Book Award of the National Association of Multicultural Education. He has also published The Trouble With 'Normal' and The Trouble With Different for children. His fictional memoir of growing up Black and gay, Waiting for the Sissy Killer, was published in 2019.

== Bibliography ==
- Multiculturalism and the Teacher Education Experience: Essays on Race, Class, and Culture (2007) iUniverse ISBN 978-0-595-46437-1
- The Adventures of Darrell and the Invincible Man (2008) Trafford Publishing ISBN 978-1-4251-3912-4

== Filmography ==
- Holy Smoke (2007) – Writer/Director
- Hollywood and Vying (2007) – Writer/Director
- Black and Blue (2007) – Writer/Director
- Switch Swap (2007) – Writer/Director
- Communion (2007) – Writer/Director
- Wigger, a Short Film (2008) – Writer/Director
- Mama 'n' Em (2008) – Director
- An Inaugural Ride to Freedom (2009) – Producer/Director
- Wigger (2010) – Writer/Director
- An Inaugural Ride to Freedom: The Journey Continues (2013) – Director/Producer
- It Takes A Village (2019) – Writer/Producer/Director
