= Momo Pixel =

American video game designer and artist

- Born: Louisville, Kentucky
- Education: Savannah College of Art and Design
- Occupations: Video game designer, art director, advertiser
- Known for: Creator of Hair Nah

Momo Pixel is a video game designer, art director, and advertiser. She is best known for her work focusing on Black women, including Hair Nah, a game dealing with issues of African-American hair.

== Early life and education ==
Pixel is a native of Louisville, Kentucky. She holds a degree from the Savannah College of Art and Design.

== Career ==
Pixel was an art director for the advertising company Wieden+Kennedy. She has worked on ad campaigns for companies such as Nintendo, Kentucky Fried Chicken, and Instagram.

In 2020, Pixel exhibited an interactive art installation at the MassArt Art Museum called Momoland LvL4. The exhibit consisted of a virtual reality game, her paintings, and a sculpture. She also designed a mobile game in support of an album released by NLE Choppa.

After moving to Portland, Oregon, Pixel encountered multiple strangers touching her hair, which was long and braided at the time. Pixel created Hair Nah in response, a web-based game where players control a black woman who has to deflect hands trying to touch her hair. The game allows the player to customize their player character, choosing from multiple hair styles and skin tones. The game was considered a viral success, and was covered by Vice and Newsweek.

Pixel received positive feedback from people around the world, "expressing gratitude for drawing attention to the daily forms of objectification that users experience". Researcher and professor Kishonna Gray has cited Hair Nah in her classroom teaching, citing the ability to "swat away" unwelcome touching as giving power and agency that was "not afforded [to] Black women in traditional settings". The game was also praised for demonstrating anti-racist resistance in popular culture.

Pixel worked on an augmented reality game filter for Google Play which was "partly inspired by the obstacles young Black girls face in the gaming industry".

== Awards and honors ==
In 2024, Pixel received a Black Tech Achievement Gaming Award which honors "those who are making an impact and are championing diversity within the gaming sector".
