= Kenneth R. Rosen =

American journalist and author

- Born: New York City, U.S.
- Education: Columbia University; Savannah College of Art and Design (BFA); Valley Forge Military Academy and College
- Occupations: Writer, journalist
- Writing career
- Language: English, Italian
- Years active: 2010–present
- Notable awards: Bayeux Calvados-Normandy Award for war correspondents
- Website: Official website

Kenneth R. Rosen is an American writer, journalist and war correspondent based in Central Europe. He is the recipient of the Bayeux Calvados-Normandy Award for war correspondents and has been twice a finalist for the Livingston Awards. Rosen is the author of two nonfiction books, Bulletproof Vest and Troubled: The Failed Promise of America’s Behavioral Treatment Programs, which were published in 2020 and 2021 respectively. He is a contributing writer at Wired. He has also written for The New Yorker, The New York Times, The Atavist, Politico and others.

== Education and career ==
Rosen was born in 1990, in New York City. He attended Valley Forge Military Academy and College and Savannah College of Art and Design. He received a BFA degree from Savannah College in 2014. He also attended Columbia University. In 2021, Rosen received the Media & Arts for Peace certificate from the United States Institute of Peace.

Rosen started his journalism career in 2010 and worked for local dailies such as Savannah Morning News in Georgia and the Juneau Empire in Alaska. In 2014, he joined The New York Times as a news assistant where he worked for 6 years. Rosen joined Newsweek as a senior editor and correspondent in 2020 and worked there for one year before dedicating himself to independent journalism and writing. Over the years, various prominent news outlets have published his works. His writings have been translated and published into Arabic, Spanish, German, and Japanese.

In 2018, he received a Bayeux Calvados-Normandy Award for war correspondents for feature writing for The Devil's Henchmen, an article in The Atavist about the burial rites of Islamic State fighters in Iraq. He was twice a finalist for the Livingston Award in international reporting in 2018 and 2020.

In 2020, Rosen authored Bulletproof Vest which was published by Bloomsbury Publishing. The book contemplates a bulletproof vest on a molecular level and on the world stage. Bulletproof Vest received critical reviews from major outlets including Los Angeles Review of Books and Kirkus Reviews with The Day calling it "a tense but beautifully written frontlines study of war". The book is a part of Object Lessons series, a book series about the hidden lives of ordinary things. Wired (magazine) named Bulletproof Vest on their list of Most Fascinating Books WIRED Read in 2020.

In 2021, Rosen's second book, Troubled: The Failed Promise of America’s Behavioral Treatment Programs, was published by Little A. The book examines the industry of residential treatment programs for young adult. Troubled was listed on the New Books to Watch and Editor's Choice for the month of January 2021 by The New York Times. Robert Kolker reviewed it in The New York Times Book Review and called it "Not just a work of extended empathy but a public service". The book also received positive reviews from Kirkus Reviews and The Times Literary Supplement.

== Bibliography ==
- Bulletproof Vest (2020), ISBN 978-1501353024
- Troubled: The Failed Promise of America’s Behavioral Treatment Programs (2021), ISBN 978-1542007887
- Polar War: Submarines, Spies and the Struggle for Power in a Melting Arctic (2026), ISBN 978-1668052334
