= Akintunde Warnock =

American screenwriter

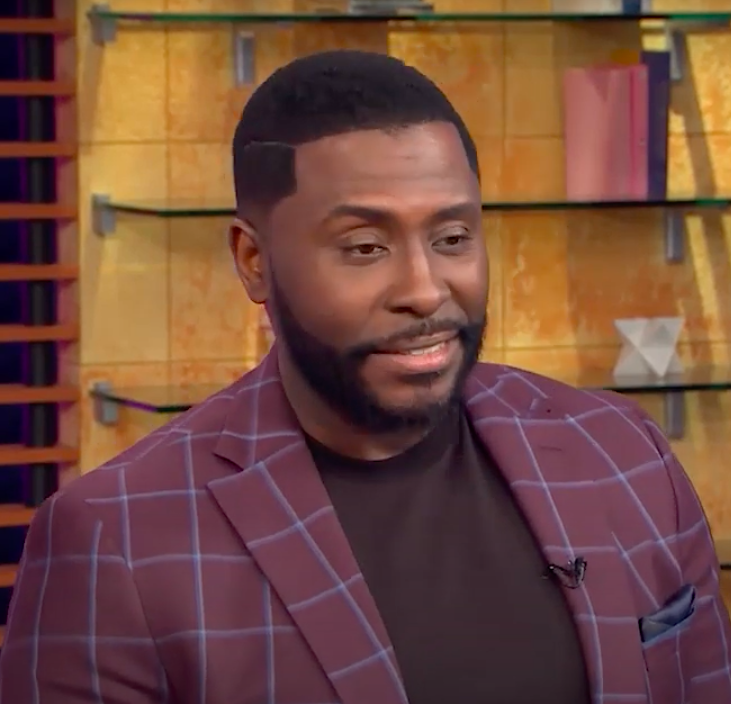
- Akintunde in 2020
- Born: 23 October 1971

Akintunde Warnock (born October 23, 1971), better known as Akintunde or Ak, is a comedian, writer, director and actor from the United States.

== Career ==
Warnock first realized that he wanted to be a comedian whilst he was a pupil at Ramah Junior Academy in Savannah, Georgia. He was a fat child who was bullied and he enjoyed the laughter of his classmates when he mocked his tormentors.

After working as a barber he began a full-time career as a stand-up comedian in 1995. He travelled the United States performing all over the country, on BET's Comicview, and in the Turner South series That Comedy Show. He wrote material for the television show It's Showtime at the Apollo, and comedians Monique and Chris Tucker.

He became a Christian in 1999 and adapted Atlanta Bishop Eddie Long's book I Don't Want Delilah, I Need You into a movie screenplay.

He made a documentary on black comedians called No Joke, which he co-produced with comedian J. Anthony Brown from the Tom Joyner Morning Show. The documentary features life on the road with black comedians such as Steve Harvey, Renaldo Ray and Paul Mooney.

== Personal life ==
Warnock and his wife, Eunissa, have five children: Akintunde II (born 1994); Jaleel (1996); Deja (1997); Khalia (August 2000); Elijah Prince (November 2002). They live in Columbia, South Carolina.

== Discography ==
- Brutally Honest (2004)

Christian Comedy Live (2006)

- It's Time to Laugh, Vol.1 (2009)
