= Joshua Rashaad McFadden =

American visual artist

Joshua Rashaad McFadden is an American visual artist whose primary medium is photography. McFadden explores the use of archival material within his work and is known for his portraiture. He also conceptually investigates themes related to identity, masculinity, history, race, and sexuality.

== Biography ==
Born in Rochester, New York, a city known for photography, McFadden was raised by his mother and father and has three brothers. McFadden obtained a bachelor's degree in fine art from Elizabeth City State University, a Historically Black University (HBCU) in North Carolina, where he took his first class in black and white photography.

== Education ==
McFadden holds a BA in Fine Art from Elizabeth City State University, and a Master of Fine Art (MFA) in photography from Savannah College of Art and Design.

== Career ==
McFadden documented the protests following the murder of George Floyd in Minneapolis. He has spoken about the need for diverse representation in media, especially in photography. McFadden has also shared experiences of facing challenges in his profession due to his race, even when possessing valid press credentials.

McFadden is an Assistant Professor of Photography at Rochester Institute of Technology (RIT) in the School of Photographic Arts and Sciences - College of Art and Design.
