= Akintunde Akinleye =

Nigerian photojournalist (born 1971)

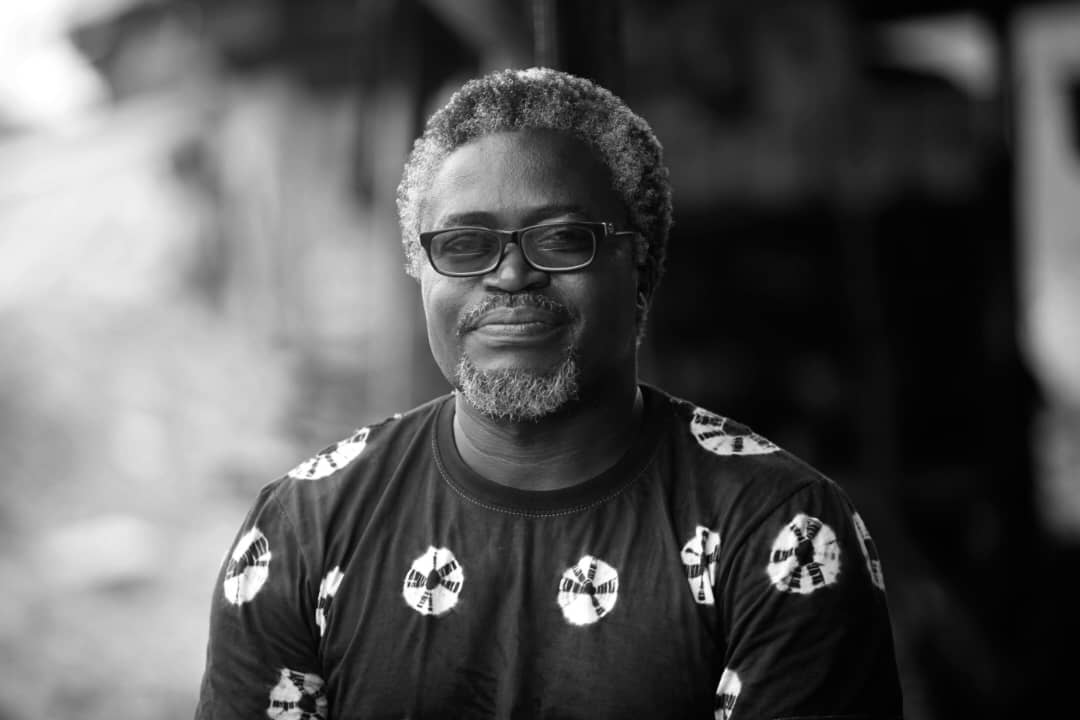
- Born: 19 April 1971 (age 55); Mushin, Lagos
- Citizenship: Nigeria
- Education: Carleton University, Ottawa
- Occupation: Photojournalist

Akintunde Akinleye (born 19 April 1971) is a Nigerian photojournalist whose images centre around photo-activism and trial narrative subjects. A former Reuters photographer covering West Africa, his photography has documented Nigeria's postcolonial history. He is the first Nigerian photographer to receive the World Press Photo prize (2007), for his image of a pipeline explosion in Lagos. The same year, he received the National Geographic All Roads award. His photographs have been published in Time, Vogue, The New York Times, and other publications.

== Early life ==
Although his parents—Joel Oloruntoba and Ebuoluwa Racheal—were from Okemesi-Ekiti in southwest Nigeria, Akintunde was born and raised in Mushin, Lagos. Akintunde was considered too playful by his mother, who sought to distract him from playing football on the streets. At age 11, she was said to have gifted him a camera when she noticed that he enjoyed drawing images in the sand. He was also enrolled in an after-school apprenticeship program at a local photo studio to learn portraiture.

== Education ==
At the age of five, Akintunde started his primary education at St. Jude's Primary School in Mushin and later transferred to Layi-Oyekanmi Primary School when the government expanded the public school system in 1979. He then attended Eko Boys' High School (EBHS) for his secondary school education from 1983 to 1988.

In 1997, he received a bachelor's degree in Social Studies Education from Ondo State University in Ado Ekiti (Now Ekiti State University) and attended the Nigerian Institute of Journalism (NIJ) in Lagos for a post-graduate diploma in Journalism.

After receiving two master's degrees in Mass Communication at the University of Lagos and in Film Studies at Carleton University, Ottawa respectively, he began a Ph.D. program in anthropology, focusing on the dynamic complexities of framing, visual material culture, and representation at Carleton University, Ottawa, Canada.

Upon completing a workshop on documentary photography and photojournalism, organised by the World Press Photo Foundation at the Nigeria Institute of Journalism in Lagos in 2005, Akintunde was appointed a guest lecturer in the proficiency certificate in photojournalism, in the quest to elevate the standard of practice of the profession in Nigeria. As a PhD candidate, he has taught courses in African popular culture, African cinema, and visual anthropology, assisting designated professors in African Studies and anthropology at Carleton University, Ottawa, Canada. During the fieldwork for his doctoral research: Gendering a Small God: Gelede Religion, Pentecostal Media, and Spirituality in Urban Lagos, Akintunde took up an adjunct teaching position in the school of Media and Film at the Pan-Atlantic University, Lagos for practical delivery of topics in photo/video-journalism to participating students.

== Career ==
=== Photojournalism ===
Akintunde began his photojournalism career at Daily Independent, a local newspaper in Lagos, a few years after receiving his bachelor's degree. While covering the coronation of the Oba of Lagos, Oba Riliwan Akiolu, he was beaten by security officers for getting too close to Atiku Abubakar, Vice President of Nigeria. His camera was broken, and he spent a month in hospital, it was reported. He began working for Reuters in 2006 and became a correspondent for the West Africa region while working with Finbarr O'Reilly, the Reuters regional editor at the time. He temporarily quit journalism, and resigned from his job at Reuters in 2018 to devote his energy full-time to his doctoral studies.

A 2015 New York Times article noted that his work brings "kinetic landscapes to life". Akinleye has received four nominations for the Prix Pictet award in Photography and Sustainability for his works on Delta: A Vanishing Wetland, Delta Bush Refineries, Makoko: Life on Stilt, and Lagos' Firemen.

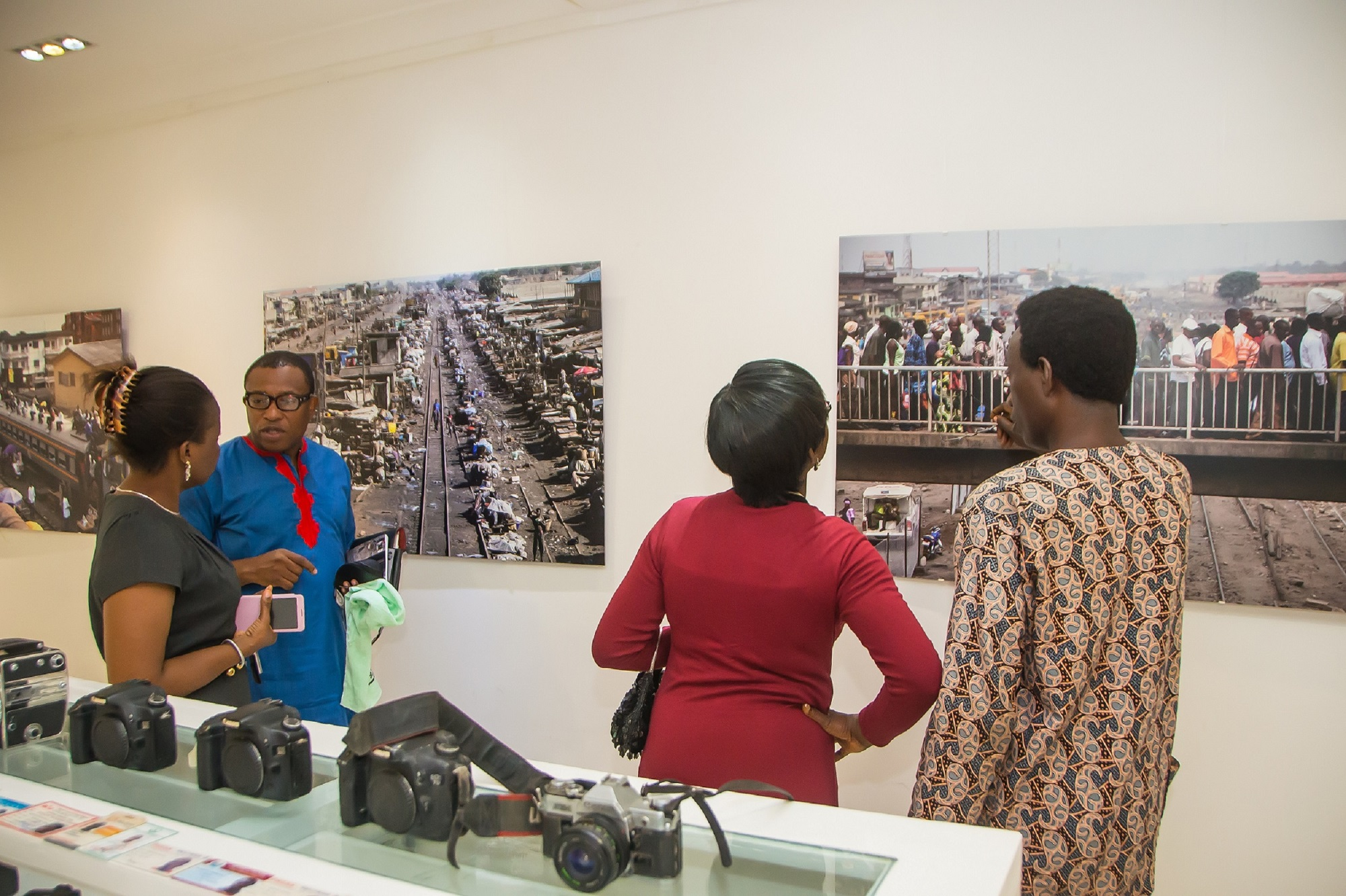
Akintunde Akinleye's exhibition at Red Door Gallery, 2015.

=== The World Press Photo Prize ===
In 2007, Akinleye won the World Press Photo prize for spot news single for his image of a man rinsing soot from his face after a pipeline explosion at Abule Egba, a Lagos suburb. He had pulled through the Lagos traffic on a bike and arrived at the scene of the explosion just ten minutes after it started. He recounted that while surrounded by the billowing smoke, he saw a man who had tried dousing the fire with his bucket of water using the last drop to wash his face. He took about five or six images of the man and moved to another scene. The prize-winning photograph was said to be the last of the sequence of images he took.

Akinleye debated whether to send the photograph to his editor, saying: "I thought photojournalism shouldn't be too artistic and I thought it [the photograph] was too beautiful, too dramatic to be good. I sat there for about half an hour debating whether I should send it."

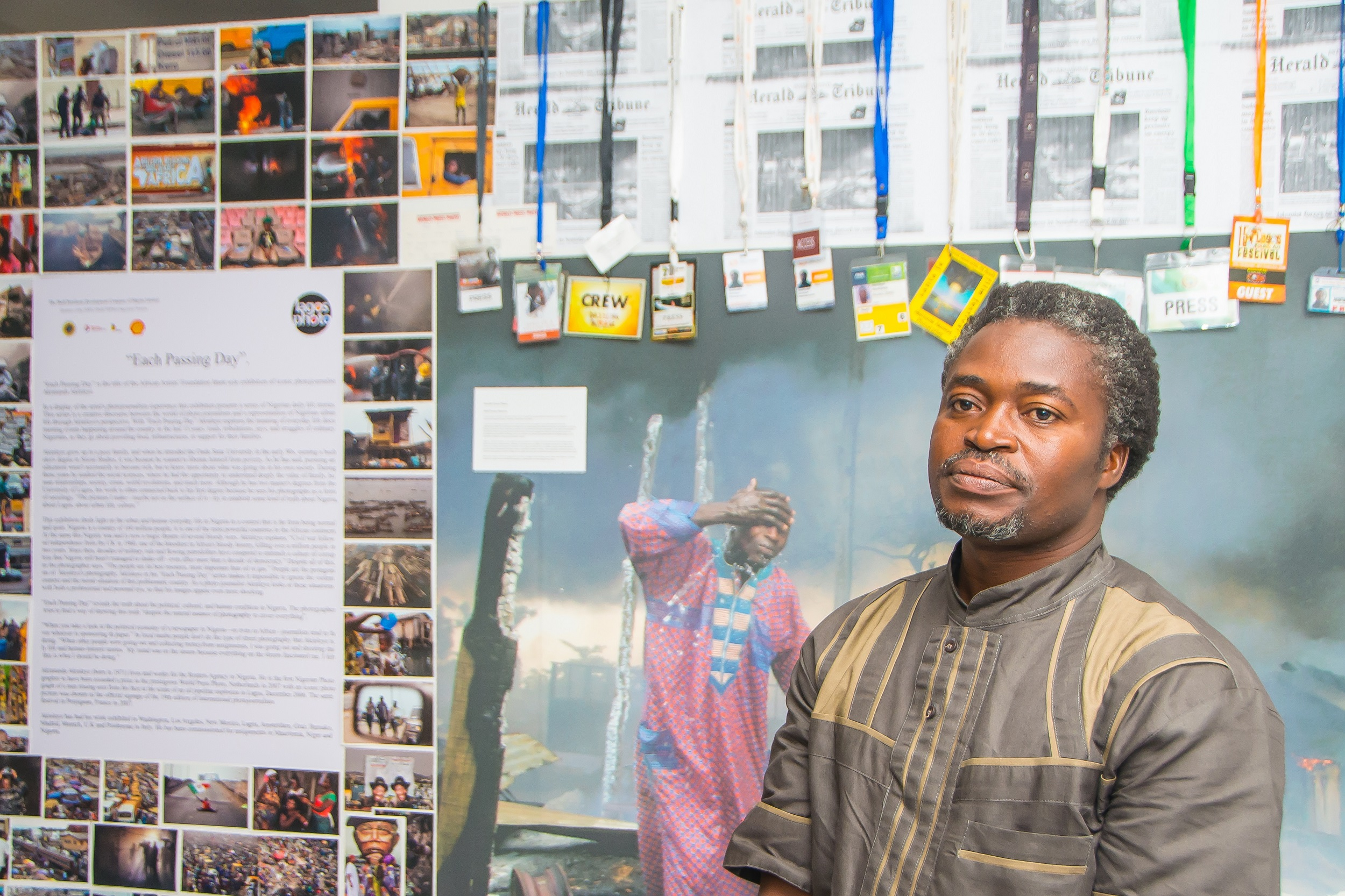
Akinleye at his exhibition in 2015.

The image was named by The Guardian as one of the best photos of the decade.

== Personal life ==
Akinleye is married to Omobolanle Dada-Akinleye ("Omo-B"). They have four children; Akinbusayo, Akinola, Ibukunoluwa, and Eniola.

== Awards, nominations and residencies ==
- World Press Photo prize (2007)
- National Geographic All Roads award (2008)
- Nominations for Prix Pictet award on Photography and Sustainability for his works on:

- Delta: A Vanishing Wetland (2012)
- Delta Bush Refineries (2015)
- Makoko: Life on Stilt (2019)
- Lagos' Firemen (2021)

- Residency fellowship, University of Texas at Dallas (2008)
- Residency fellowship, Thami Mnyele Foundation, Amsterdam (2010)

=== Selected exhibitions ===
- Delta Bush Refineries and Other Stories, Omenka Gallery, Lagos, Nigeria, 2016.
- Each Passing Day, Red Door Gallery, Lagos, Nigeria, 2015.
- Spiritual Highway, School of Oriental and African Studies (SOAS), London, 2014.
- Wole Soyinka and the Rest of Us, Brunei Gallery, SOAS, United Kingdom, 2012.
- Delta: A Vanishing Wetland (For a Sustainable World), Bamako, Mali, 2011.
- Troubles of a Blessed Country, California and Washington, D.C., 2007.

== Publications ==
- Janson, Marloes and Akinleye, Akintunde (2015). "The Spiritual Highway: Religious World Making in Megacity Lagos", In Material Religion, 11, (4), 2015, pp. 550–56 https://doi.org/10.1080/17432200.2015.1103484
- Akinleye, Akintunde (2013). "Paradox". In Rogue Urbanism: Emergent African Cities (ed.) Edgar Pieterse and AbdouMaliq Simone. Johannesburg: Jacana Media, pp. 355–364, 2013.
- Oyebode, Aisha and Akinleye, Akintunde (2021). The Stolen Daughters of Chibok. Power-House Books, New York.

== Papers and posters presentations ==
- "Beyond the Frame: Photojournalism in the Context of Africa, Centre for African Studies", University of Florida, Gainesville, U.S.A, February 2020.
- "Anthropocene Lives in Deviance: Delta Bush Refineries and Other Stories". Paper presented at the annual conference of the Anthropology Graduate Students' Association, York University, Toronto, Canada, March 2019.
- "Closing the Missing Link: Climate Change Awareness Campaign and Children's Photographic Production for Museum Exhibit". Poster presentation @Canadian Museum of History, December 2019.
