= Senator Colquitt =

Senator Colquitt may refer to:

- Alfred H. Colquitt (1824–1894), U.S. Senator from Georgia from 1883 to 1894
- Oscar Branch Colquitt (1861–1940), Texas State Senate
- Walter T. Colquitt (1799–1855), U.S. Senator from Georgia from 1843 to 1848
