= 2020 United States presidential election in Georgia =

- November 3, 2020
- Turnout: 66.2% ▲6.1 pp

Nominee	Joe Biden	Donald Trump
Party	Democratic	Republican
Home state	Delaware	Florida
Running mate	Kamala Harris	Mike Pence
Electoral vote	16	0
Popular vote	2,473,633	2,461,854
Percentage	49.47%	49.24%

Biden
40–50%
50–60%
60–70%
70–80%
80–90%
90–100%
Trump
40–50%
50–60%
60–70%
70–80%
80–90%
90–100%
Tie/No data
President before election
Donald Trump
Republican
Elected President
Joe Biden
Democratic

The 2020 United States presidential election in Georgia was held on Tuesday, November 3, 2020, as part of the 2020 United States presidential election in which all 50 states plus the District of Columbia participated. Georgia voters chose electors to represent them in the Electoral College via a popular vote, pitting the Republican Party's nominee, incumbent President Donald Trump of Florida, and running mate Vice President Mike Pence of Indiana against Democratic Party nominee, former Vice President Joe Biden of Delaware, and his running mate Senator Kamala Harris of California. Georgia has 16 electoral votes in the Electoral College.

Biden narrowly won Georgia by a 49.47% plurality over Trump's 49.24% vote share: a margin of 0.23% and 11,779 votes. Leading up to the election, Georgia was seen as a key swing state in both the presidential and senatorial elections—both a regular Class II U.S. Senate election and a special election—due to the rapid growth and diversification of Atlanta's suburbs, where Republicans were once dominant. Polls of the state throughout the campaign indicated a close race, and prior to election day, most news organizations considered Georgia a toss-up. This was the only state in the Deep South carried by Biden, made possible by significant demographic shifts over the previous decade, especially in Metro Atlanta. While Georgia still has a relative GOP lean at the state level, the explosive growth of its capital city and surrounding suburbs has shifted it into a swing state at the federal level.

Like in other states, Trump had an early lead on election night due to the state counting in-person votes first on that day, before counting mail-in ballots over the following days. Biden subsequently cut into Trump's margin over the course of the week and eventually overtook Trump on Friday morning. Although majority-minority Burke County—near Augusta—flipped to Trump after supporting Hillary Clinton in 2016, Biden was able to build Clinton's vote shares in the densely populated Metro Atlanta counties of Gwinnett, Cobb, and Henry, increasing her vote shares of 50%, 48%, and 50% to 58%, 56%, and 60%, respectively–in all three cases, the best showing for a non-Georgian Democrat since John F. Kennedy in the 1960 election.

Biden became the first Democrat to carry the state since Bill Clinton in 1992; the first to win a statewide election in Georgia since 2006; the first to carry a state in the Deep South since Bill Clinton carried Louisiana in 1996; and the first to gain over 70% of the vote in Fulton County since Franklin D. Roosevelt in 1944. Georgia was the closest state in 2020, the second-closest being Arizona, marking the first time since 1948 that the Democratic nominee won both Sun Belt states in the same presidential election (Clinton won each state in separate elections). Georgia is also one of only two states that backed Biden that didn't back Barack Obama in either of his runs for president in 2008 and 2012, the other being Arizona.

Due to the close margins in the initial election results, Georgia Secretary of State Brad Raffensperger announced on November 11 that a recount by hand would be conducted. The recount was completed on November 18, and Biden was confirmed to be the winner on November 19. With a margin of 0.23%, this was the closest presidential election in state history.

== Primary elections ==
The presidential preference primary was originally scheduled for March 24, 2020. On March 14, it was moved to May 19 due to concerns over the COVID-19 pandemic. On April 9, the preference primary was again rescheduled to June 9, being combined with the regular, usually-separate primary for other federal and state primaries as well as local elections in some counties, the first time in Georgia history that all primaries were combined on the same date. Secretary of State Raffensperger approved sending out absentee ballot application forms to 6.9 million active voters for the combined primary, of which 1.1 million absentee ballots were requested. The total turnout for the combined primary was the highest since the 2008 presidential primary, and broke the record for most absentee ballots cast in a Georgia primary.

=== Republican primary ===
Incumbent President Donald Trump ran unopposed in the Republican primary and thus received all of Georgia's 76 delegates to the 2020 Republican National Convention.

2020 Georgia Republican presidential primary
Candidate	Votes	%	Delegates
Donald Trump	947,352	100	76
Total	947,352	100.00	76

=== Democratic primary ===
2020 Georgia Democratic presidential primary
Candidate	Votes	%	Delegates
Joe Biden	922,177	84.86	105
Bernie Sanders (withdrawn)	101,668	9.36	
Elizabeth Warren (withdrawn)	21,906	2.02	
Andrew Yang (withdrawn)	9,117	0.84	
Michael Bloomberg (withdrawn)	7,657	0.70	
Pete Buttigieg (withdrawn)	6,346	0.58	
Michael Bennet (withdrawn)	5,154	0.47	
Amy Klobuchar (withdrawn)	4,317	0.40	
Tulsi Gabbard (withdrawn)	4,117	0.38	
Tom Steyer (withdrawn)	1,752	0.16	
John Delaney (withdrawn)	1,476	0.14	
Deval Patrick (withdrawn)	1,042	0.10	
Total	1,086,729	100%	105

== General election ==
=== Final predictions ===
Source	Ranking
The Cook Political Report	Tossup
Inside Elections	Tilt D (flip)
Sabato's Crystal Ball	Lean D (flip)
Politico	Tossup
RCP	Tossup
Niskanen	Tossup
CNN	Tossup
The Economist	Tossup
CBS News	Tossup
270towin	Tossup
ABC News	Lean D (flip)
NPR	Tossup
NBC News	Tossup
538	Tossup

=== Polling ===
View source data.

Aggregate polls

Source of poll aggregation	Dates administered	Dates updated	Joe Biden Democratic	Donald Trump Republican	Other/ Undecided (Note: Calculated by taking the difference of 100% and all other candidates combined.)	Margin
270 to Win	Oct 29 – Nov 2, 2020	November 3, 2020	47.6%	47.4%	5.0%	Biden +0.2
Real Clear Politics	Oct 23 – Nov 2, 2020	November 3, 2020	47.2%	48.2%	4.6%	Trump +1.0
FiveThirtyEight	until November 2, 2020	November 3, 2020	48.5%	47.4%	4.1%	Biden +1.2
Average			47.8%	47.7%	4.6%	Biden +0.1

Polls

Poll source	Date(s) administered	Sample size (Note: Key: A – all adults RV – registered voters LV – likely voters V – unclear)	Margin of error	Donald Trump Republican	Joe Biden Democratic	Jo Jorgensen Libertarian	Other	Undecided
Trafalgar Group	Oct 31 – Nov 2, 2020	1,041 (LV)	± 2.96%	50%	45%	3%	1% (Note: "Someone else" with 1%)	1%
SurveyMonkey/Axios	Oct 20 – Nov 2, 2020	3,962 (LV)	± 2.5%	48% (Note: Overlapping sample with the previous SurveyMonkey/Axios poll, but more information available regarding sample size)	50%	–	–	–
Landmark Communications/WSBTV	Nov 1, 2020	500 (LV)	± 4.4%	50%	46%	3%	–	1%
Insider Advantage/Center for American Greatness (Note: The Center for American Greatness is a pro-Trump organization)	Nov 1, 2020	500 (LV)	± 4.4%	48%	46%	4%	–	2%
AYTM/Aspiration	Oct 30 – Nov 1, 2020	380 (LV)	–	48%	52%	–	–	–
Swayable	Oct 27 – Nov 1, 2020	438 (LV)	± 6.2%	44%	54%	2%	–	–
Data for Progress	Oct 27 – Nov 1, 2020	1,036 (LV)	± 3%	48%	50%	1%	0% (Note: Hawkins (G) and "Other candidate or write-in" with 0%)	–
AtlasIntel	Oct 30–31, 2020	679 (LV)	± 4%	48%	46%	–	6%	–
Emerson College	Oct 29–31, 2020	749 (LV)	± 3.5%	49% (Note: With voters who lean towards a given candidate)	48%	–	2% (Note: "Someone else" with 2%)	–
Morning Consult	Oct 22–31, 2020	1,743 (LV)	± 2.0%	46%	49%	–	–	–
Landmark Communications/WSBTV	Oct 28, 2020	750 (LV)	± 3.6%	48%	47%	3%	–	3%
Public Policy Polling	Oct 27–28, 2020	661 (V)	–	46%	48%	–	4% (Note: "Someone else" with 4%)	2%
SurveyMonkey/Axios	Oct 1–28, 2020	7,019 (LV)	–	48%	50%	–	–	–
Monmouth University	Oct 23–27, 2020	504 (RV)	± 4.4%	45%	50%	2%	1% (Note: "Other candidate" with 1%; "No one" with 0%)	2%
Monmouth University	Oct 23–27, 2020	504 (LV)	± 4.4%	46% (Note: With a likely voter turnout model featuring higher turnout than in the 2016 presidential election)	50%	–	–	–
Monmouth University	Oct 23–27, 2020	504 (LV)	± 4.4%	48% (Note: With a likely voter turnout model featuring lower turnout than in the 2016 presidential election)	50%	–	–	–
Swayable	Oct 23–26, 2020	373 (LV)	± 6.9%	48%	51%	1%	–	–
Civiqs/Daily Kos	Oct 23–26, 2020	1,041 (LV)	± 3.3%	46%	51%	–	2%	0%
Wick Surveys	Oct 24–25, 2020	1,000 (LV)	± 3.1%	49%	47%	–	–	–
YouGov/CBS	Oct 20–23, 2020	1,090 (LV)	± 3.4%	49%	49%	–	2% (Note: "Other third party" with 2%)	0%
University of Georgia/AJC	Oct 14–23, 2020	1,145 (LV)	± 4%	46%	47%	3%	–	4%
Landmark Communications/WSBTV	Oct 21, 2020	500 (LV)	± 4.4%	49%	45%	–	–	4%
Citizen Data	Oct 17–20, 2020	1,000 (LV)	± 3%	44%	48%	1%	2% (Note: "Other" with 2%; Hawkins (G) with 0%)	5%
Morning Consult	Oct 11–20, 2020	1,672 (LV)	± 2.4%	48%	48%	–	–	–
Emerson College	Oct 17–19, 2020	506 (LV)	± 4.3%	48%	47%	–	5% (Note: "Someone else" with 5%)	–
Siena College/NYT Upshot	Oct 13–19, 2020	759 (LV)	± 4.1%	45%	45%	2%	2% (Note: Hawkins (G) and "Someone else" with 1%; would not vote with 0%)	7% (Note: Includes "Refused")
Opinion Insight/American Action Forum (Note: The American Action Forum is a 501 organization which usually supports Republican candidates)	Oct 12–15, 2020	801 (LV)	± 3.46%	46%	49%	–	3% (Note: "Someone else" with 3%; would not vote with 0%)	4%
Garin-Hart-Yang/Jon Ossoff (Note: Poll sponsored by Ossoff's campaign)	Oct 11–14, 2020	600 (LV)	–	44%	51%	–	–	–
Quinnipiac University	Oct 8–12, 2020	1,040 (LV)	± 3.0%	44%	51%	–	1%	4%
SurveyUSA	Oct 8–12, 2020	677 (LV)	± 5.7%	46%	48%	–	2% (Note: "Some other candidate" with 2%)	4%
Data for Progress	Oct 8–11, 2020	782 (LV)	± 3.5%	46%	46%	2%	1% (Note: Hawkins (G) with 1%)	5%
Morning Consult	Oct 2–11, 2020	1,837 (LV)	± 2.3%	49%	47%	–	–	–
Public Policy Polling	Oct 8–9, 2020	528 (V)	± 4.3%	46%	47%	–	3% (Note: "Someone else" with 3%)	3%
Landmark Communications	Oct 7, 2020	600 (LV)	± 4.0%	48.6%	46.8%	0.7%	–	3.9%
YouGov/CCES	Sep 29 – Oct 7, 2020	1,456 (LV)	–	47%	48%	–	–	–
University of Georgia/AJC	Sep 27 – Oct 6, 2020	1,106 (LV)	± 2.9%	47%	46%	3%	–	3%
Landmark Communications/WSB	Sep 30, 2020	500 (LV)	± 4%	45%	47%	3%	–	–
SurveyMonkey/Tableau	Sep 1–30, 2020	3,468 (LV)	–	48%	49%	–	–	2%
Civiqs/Daily Kos	Sep 26–29, 2020	969 (LV)	± 3.5%	47%	50%	–	2%	1%
Hart Research Associates/Human Rights Campaign (Note: The Human Rights Campaign endorsed Biden prior to this poll's sampling period)	Sep 24–27, 2020	400 (LV)	± 4.9%	47%	50%	–	–	–
Quinnipiac University	Sep 23–27, 2020	1,125 (LV)	± 2.9%	47%	50%	–	1%	2%
Redfield & Wilton Strategies	Sep 23–26, 2020	789 (LV)	± 3.49%	44%	45%	2%	1% (Note: Hawkins (G) with 1%; "Another Third Party/Write-in" with 0%)	8%
YouGov/CBS	Sep 22–25, 2020	1,164 (LV)	± 3.4%	47%	46%	–	2%	5%
Monmouth University	Sep 17–21, 2020	402 (RV)	± 4.9%	47%	46%	2%	0% (Note: "No one" with 0%; "Other candidate" with no voters)	4%
Monmouth University	Sep 17–21, 2020	402 (LV)	± 4.9%	48%	46%	2%	–	4%
Monmouth University	Sep 17–21, 2020	402 (LV)	± 4.9%	50%	45%	1%	–	3%
Siena College/NYT Upshot	Sep 16–21, 2020	523 (LV)	± 4.9%	45%	45%	2%	0% (Note: "Someone else" and would not vote with 0%)	8%
University of Georgia/AJC	Sep 11–20, 2020	1,150 (LV)	± 4%	47%	47%	1%	–	4%
Data for Progress (D)	Sep 14–19, 2020	800 (LV)	± 3.5%	45% (Note: Standard VI response)	45%	1%	0% (Note: Hawkins (G) with 0%)	8%
Data for Progress (D)	Sep 14–19, 2020	800 (LV)	± 3.5%	46% (Note: If only Biden and Trump were candidates)	46%	–	–	8%
GBAO Strategies/Warnock for Georgia (Note: Poll sponsored by Democrat Raphael Warnock's campaign for U.S. Senate)	Sep 14–16, 2020	600 (LV)	± 4%	46%	49%	–	–	–
Redfield & Wilton Strategies	Sep 12–16, 2020	800 (LV)	± 3.46%	46%	45%	2%	1%	6%
Morning Consult	Aug 29 – Sep 7, 2020	1,486 (LV)	± (2%–4%)	48% (Note: Overlapping sample with the previous Morning Consult poll, but more information available regarding sample size)	46%	–	–	–
Fabrizio Ward/Hart Research Associates/AARP	Aug 30 – Sep 5, 2020	800 (LV)	± 3.5%	46%	47%	–	1% (Note: Would not vote with 1%)	6%
Opinion Insight/American Action Forum	Aug 30 – Sep 2, 2020	800 (LV)	± 3.46%	46%	47%	2%	1% (Note: Hawkins (G) and would not vote with 0%)	4%
Landmark Communications/WSB	Aug 29–31, 2020	500 (LV)	± 4.4%	48%	41%	2%	–	9%
SurveyMonkey/Tableau	Aug 1–31, 2020	2,772 (LV)	–	49%	49%	–	–	2%
Morning Consult	Aug 21–30, 2020	1,392 (LV)	± (2%–4%)	46%	49%	–	–	–
HarrisX/Matt Lieberman (Note: Matt Lieberman is a Democratic candidate in Georgia's 2020 special Senate election)	Aug 20–30, 2020	1,616 (RV)	± 2.4%	46%	52%	–	2% (Note: "Refused" with 2%)	–
PPP/Fair Fight Action (Note: Fair Fight Action is the non-profit arm of Fair Fight, founded by Stacey Abrams who endorsed Biden prior to this poll's sampling period)	Aug 24–25, 2020	782 (V)	± 3.5%	46%	47%	–	–	6%
Morning Consult	Aug 7–16, 2020	1,265 (LV)	± (2%–4%)	47%	46%	–	–	–
Landmark Communications	Aug 14–15, 2020	500 (LV)	± 4.4%	48%	45%	4%	–	3%
SurveyUSA	Aug 6–8, 2020	623 (LV)	± 5.3%	44%	46%	–	4% (Note: "Some other candidate" with 4%)	6%
YouGov/CBS	Jul 28–31, 2020	1,109 (LV)	± 3.4%	45%	46%	–	3% (Note: "Someone else/third party" with 3%; would not vote with 0%)	5%
HIT Strategies/DFER (Note: This poll's sponsor, DFER, primarily supports Democratic candidates)	Jul 23–31, 2020	400 (RV)	± 4.9%	40%	44%	–	6% (Note: "Third party candidate" with 4%; would not vote with 2%)	10%
SurveyMonkey/Tableau	Jul 1–31, 2020	3,745 (LV)	–	53%	45%	–	–	2%
Monmouth University	Jul 23–27, 2020	402 (RV)	± 2%	47%	47%	3%	–	3%
Monmouth University	Jul 23–27, 2020	402 (LV)	± 2%	48%	47%	2%	–	3%
Monmouth University	Jul 23–27, 2020	402 (LV)	± 2%	49%	46%	2%	–	4%
Morning Consult	Jul 17–26, 2020	1,337 (LV)	± 2.7%	46%	47%	–	–	–
Public Policy Polling/AFSCME (Note: AFSCME endorsed Biden prior to this poll's sampling period)	Jul 23–24, 2020	722 (V)	–	45%	46%	–	–	9%
Trafalgar Group	Jul 15–18, 2020	1,023 (LV)	± 3.0%	50%	43%	2%	2% (Note: "Another Party candidate")	2%
Spry Strategies/American Principles Project (Note: This poll's sponsor is the American Principles Project, a 501(c)(4) organization that supports the Republican Party.)	Jul 11–16, 2020	700 (LV)	± 3.7%	49%	46%	–	–	5%
Garin-Hart-Yang/Jon Ossoff	Jul 9–15, 2020	800 (LV)	± 3.5%	43%	47%	–	–	10%
Gravis Marketing/OANN	Jul 2, 2020	513 (LV)	± 4.3%	48%	45%	-	–	8%
SurveyMonkey/Tableau	Jun 8–30, 2020	2,059 (LV)	–	49%	49%	–	–	2%
Public Policy Polling/End Citizens United (Note: This poll is sponsored by End Citizens United, a PAC which has endorsed Democratic candidates who are against the landmark Citizens United court ruling)	Jun 25–26, 2020	734 (RV)	± 3.6%	45%	49%	-	–	6%
Fox News	Jun 20–23, 2020	1,013 (RV)	± 3.0%	45%	47%	-	4% (Note: "Other" with 3%; "would not vote" with 1%)	5%
Public Policy Polling	Jun 12–13, 2020	661 (V)	± 3.4%	46%	48%	-	–	6%
TargetSmart	May 21–27, 2020	321 (RV)	± 5.5%	44%	40%	-	10% (Note: "Different candidate" with 8%; would not vote with 2%)	6%
Morning Consult	May 17–26, 2020	1,396 (LV)	–	49%	47%	–	–	–
Civiqs/Daily Kos	May 16–18, 2020	1,339 (RV)	± 3.1%	47%	48%	-	3%	2%
The Progress Campaign (D)	May 6–15, 2020	2,893 (LV)	± 2%	47%	47%	-	–	6% (Note: Listed as "other/undecided")
BK Strategies/Republican State Leadership Committee (Note: This poll was sponsored by a Republican-supporting organization)	May 11–13, 2020	700 (LV)	± 3.7%	48%	46%	-	–	–
Public Opinion Strategies (R)	May 4–7, 2020	500 (LV)	± 4.38%	46%	47%	-	–	7% (Note: "Undecided" with 5%; "Did not answer" with 2%)
Cygnal/David Ralston (Note: Poll conducted for the Speaker of Georgia's House Republican caucus)	Apr 25–27, 2020	591 (LV)	± 4.0%	45%	44%	-	7%	5%
Battleground Connect/Doug Collins for Senate (Note: Poll sponsored by Doug Collins' campaign)	Mar 31 – Apr 1, 2020	1,035 (LV)	± 3.0%	48%	46%	-	–	6%
The Progress Campaign (D)	Mar 12–21, 2020	3,042 (RV)	± 4.5%	49%	47%	-	4%	–
University of Georgia	Feb 24 – Mar 2, 2020	1,117 (LV)	± 2.9%	51%	43%	-	4%	2%
Mason-Dixon	Dec 19–23, 2019	625 (RV)	± 4.0%	51%	44%	-	–	5%
SurveyUSA	Nov 15–18, 2019	1,303 (LV)	± 3.2%	43%	47%	-	–	10%
Climate Nexus	Nov 4–10, 2019	688 (LV)	–	47%	48%	-	–	5%
University of Georgia	Oct 30 – Nov 8, 2019	1,028 (RV)	± 3%	43%	51%	-	3%	4% (Note: Wouldn't vote with 1%; don't know/refused with 3%)
Zogby Analytics	Oct 28–30, 2019	550 (LV)	± 4.2%	44%	46%	-	–	11%

Former candidates

Donald Trump vs. Michael Bloomberg

Poll source	Date(s) administered	Sample size	Margin of error	Donald Trump (R)	Michael Bloomberg (D)	Other	Undecided
University of Georgia	Feb 24 – Mar 2, 2019	1,117 (LV)	± 2.9%	50%	42%	6%	3%
SurveyUSA	Nov 15–18, 2019	1,303 (LV)	± 3.2%	44%	42%	-	14%

Donald Trump vs. Pete Buttigieg

Poll source	Date(s) administered	Sample size	Margin of error	Donald Trump (R)	Pete Buttigieg (D)	Other	Undecided
Mason-Dixon	Dec 19–23, 2019	625 (RV)	± 4.0%	52%	43%	-	5%
SurveyUSA/WXIA-TV	Nov 15–18, 2019	1,303 (LV)	± 3.2%	45%	41%	-	14%
Climate Nexus	Nov 4–10, 2019	688 (LV)	–	49%	42%	–	9%
Atlanta Journal-Constitution	Oct 30 – Nov 8, 2019	1,028 (RV)	± 3%	43%	46%	4%	5% (Note: Wouldn't vote with 2%; don't know/refused with 5%)
Zogby Analytics	Oct 28–30, 2019	550 (LV)	± 4.2%	45%	38%	-	17%

Donald Trump vs. Kamala Harris

Poll source	Date(s) administered	Sample size	Margin of error	Donald Trump (R)	Kamala Harris (D)	Other	Undecided
SurveyUSA/WXIA-TV	Nov 15–18, 2019	1,303 (LV)	± 3.2%	46%	43%	-	11%
Climate Nexus	Nov 4–10, 2019	688 (LV)	–	49%	44%	–	7%
Atlanta Journal-Constitution	Oct 30 – Nov 8, 2019	1,028 (RV)	± 3%	44%	45%	4%	7% (Note: Wouldn't vote with 3%; don't know/refused with 4%)
Zogby Analytics	Oct 28–30, 2019	550 (LV)	± 4.2%	44%	42%	-	14%

Donald Trump vs. Bernie Sanders

Poll source	Date(s) administered	Sample size	Margin of error	Donald Trump (R)	Bernie Sanders (D)	Other	Undecided
The Progress Campaign (D)	Mar 12–21, 2020	3,042 (RV)	± 4.5%	51%	46%	3%	–
University of Georgia	Feb 24 – Mar 2, 2019	1,117 (LV)	± 2.9%	52%	41%	5%	2%
Mason-Dixon	Dec 19–23, 2019	625 (RV)	± 4.0%	52%	42%	–	6%
SurveyUSA	Nov 15–18, 2019	1,303 (LV)	± 3.2%	44%	47%	–	9%
Climate Nexus	Nov 4–10, 2019	688 (LV)	–	48%	46%	–	6%
University of Georgia	Oct 30 – Nov 8, 2019	1,028 (RV)	± 3%	44%	48%	4%	5% (Note: Wouldn't vote with 2%; don't know/refused with 3%)
Zogby Analytics	Oct 28–30, 2019	550 (LV)	± 4.2%	43%	48%	–	9%

Donald Trump vs. Elizabeth Warren

Poll source	Date(s) administered	Sample size	Margin of error	Donald Trump (R)	Elizabeth Warren (D)	Other	Undecided
University of Georgia	Feb 24 – Mar 2, 2019	1,117 (LV)	± 2.9%	52%	42%	4%	2%
Mason-Dixon	Dec 19–23, 2019	625 (RV)	± 4.0%	54%	40%	-	6%
SurveyUSA/WXIA-TV	Nov 15–18, 2019	1,303 (LV)	± 3.2%	45%	46%	-	9%
Climate Nexus	Nov 4–10, 2019	688 (LV)	–	47%	47%	–	5%
Atlanta Journal-Constitution	Oct 30 – Nov 8, 2019	1,028 (RV)	± 3%	44%	47%	4%	5%
Zogby Analytics	Oct 28–30, 2019	550 (LV)	± 4.2%	44%	42%	-	14%

Hypothetical polling

Donald Trump vs. Generic Opponent

Poll source	Date(s) administered	Sample size	Margin of error	Donald Trump (R)	Generic Opponent	Other	Undecided
AJC	Jan 6–15, 2020	1,025 (V)	± 3.1%	43.6%	46.9% (Note: "Vote against Trump" with 46.9%)	1.8% (Note: Would not vote with 1.8%)	7.7% (Note: Listed as "don't know/refused")

=== Electoral slates ===
These slates of electors were nominated by each party in order to vote in the Electoral College should their candidates win the state:

Donald Trump and Mike Pence Republican Party	Joe Biden and Kamala Harris Democratic Party	Jo Jorgensen and Spike Cohen Libertarian Party
Joseph Brennan; Ken Carroll; Vikki Consiglio; Carolyn Fisher; Patrick Gartland; Gloria Godwin; David Hanna; Mark Hennessy; Susan Holmes; John Isakson; Cathleen Latham; Daryl Moody; CJ Pearson; David Shafer; Shawn Still; C. B. Yadav	Stacey Abrams; Gloria Butler; Wendy Davis; Bobby Fuse; Deborah Gonzalez; Steve Henson; Van R. Johnson; Pedro Marin; Fenika Miller; Ben Myers; Rachel Paule; Calvin Smyre; Bob Trammell; Sachin Varghese; Nikema Williams; Cathy Woolard	Christine Austin; Stephanie Aylworth; Nelson Barnhouse; Robert Cortez; Danny Dolan; Eric Fontaine; Ryan Graham; Gretchen Mangan; Edward Metz; Mark Mosley; Chase Oliver; Robert Rouse; David Shock; John Turpish; Laura Williams; Nathan Wilson

=== Turnout ===
Voter registration for the 2020 general elections ended on October 5 in Georgia, with a final total of 7,233,584 active registered voters, an increase of 1,790,538 new voters since the 2016 election and 805,003 new voters since the 2018 gubernatorial election. Absentee mail ballots were first sent out on September 15. Unlike the June 9 combined primary, Georgia Secretary of State Brad Raffensperger declined to mail out absentee ballot request forms for the November 3 election, and instead established a website for registered voters to apply for an absentee ballot; in addition, third-party non-profit organizations such as the Voter Participation Center sent out over 2.2 million absentee request forms to registered voters by mail, including to voters who did not have computers nor Internet access. 1,731,117 absentee ballots were requested by mail or online by voters by the deadline of October 23. The Secretary of State's office allowed counties to install multiple drop boxes for absentee voters to bypass the postal system, on the condition that the drop boxes be installed on county government property and surveilled with 24-hour cameras.

Early in-person voting began on October 12. Complaints regarding hours-long early-voting lines soon arose across the state, especially in Metro Atlanta counties; state officials attributed the long durations of lines to voter enthusiasm and lack of preparation by county boards of elections.

Raffensperger recorded 126,876 votes having been cast early or absentee across the state on October 12, a record turnout for the first day of early voting in a Georgia general election. The record turnout continued throughout the first week, with 1,555,622 having been cast by October 19. By October 21, 2,124,571 votes had been cast, over 50% of total votes cast in the 2016 election, and by October 30, over 50% of registered voters had cast their ballots.

=== Results ===
State House district results: Biden 40–50% 50–60% 60–70% 70–80% 80–90% 90–100% / Trump 50–60% 60–70% 70–80% 80–90%

Following the November 3 general election, voters whose mail-in ballots were rejected could submit corrections until 5:00 p.m. on Friday, November 6.

2020 United States presidential election in Georgia
Party	Candidate	Votes	%	±%
Democratic	Joe Biden Kamala Harris	2,473,633	49.47%	+4.12%
Republican	Donald Trump (incumbent) Mike Pence (incumbent)	2,461,854	49.24%	−1.16%
Libertarian	Jo Jorgensen Spike Cohen	62,229	1.24%	−1.77%
Green	Howie Hawkins (write-in) Angela Walker (write-in)	1,013	0.02%	−0.17%
American Solidarity	Brian T. Carroll (write-in) Amar Patel (write-in)	701	0.01%	
Independent	Jade Simmons (write-in) Claudeliah Roze (write-in)	181	0.00%	
Socialism and Liberation	Gloria La Riva (write-in) Sunil Freeman (write-in)	159	0.00%	
Independent	Mark Charles (write-in) Adrian Wallace (write-in)	65	0.00%	
Constitution	Don Blankenship (write-in) William Mohr (write-in)	61	0.00%	−0.03%
Independent	Other write-ins	64	0.00%	
Total votes		4,999,960	100.00%	
Democratic win				

==== By county ====
This table displays the results by county from the presidential recount.

County	Joe Biden Democratic		Donald Trump Republican		Various candidates Other parties		Margin		Total votes cast
County	#	%	#	%	#	%	#	%	Total votes cast
Appling	1,784	21.26%	6,570	78.31%	36	0.43%	-4,786	-57.05%	8,390
Atkinson	825	26.15%	2,300	72.90%	30	0.95%	-1,475	-46.75%	3,155
Bacon	625	13.39%	4,017	86.07%	25	0.54%	-3,392	-72.68%	4,667
Baker	652	41.93%	897	57.68%	6	0.39%	-245	-14.85%	1,555
Baldwin	9,140	50.05%	8,903	48.75%	218	1.20%	237	1.30%	18,261
Banks	932	10.58%	7,795	88.53%	78	0.89%	-6,863	-77.95%	8,805
Barrow	10,453	27.55%	26,804	70.64%	689	1.81%	-16,351	-43.09%	37,946
Bartow	12,091	23.95%	37,672	74.62%	723	1.43%	-25,581	-50.67%	50,486
Ben Hill	2,393	36.46%	4,111	62.63%	60	0.91%	-1,718	-26.17%	6,564
Berrien	1,269	16.39%	6,419	82.89%	56	0.72%	-5,150	-66.50%	7,744
Bibb	43,408	61.34%	26,559	37.53%	796	1.13%	16,849	23.81%	70,763
Bleckley	1,312	22.98%	4,329	75.81%	69	1.21%	-3,017	-52.83%	5,710
Brantley	700	9.03%	6,993	90.24%	56	0.73%	-6,293	-81.21%	7,749
Brooks	2,791	39.30%	4,261	60.01%	49	0.69%	-1,470	-20.71%	7,101
Bryan	6,738	31.56%	14,240	66.70%	371	1.74%	-7,502	-35.14%	21,349
Bulloch	11,248	37.36%	18,387	61.07%	474	1.57%	-7,139	-23.71%	30,109
Burke	5,208	48.74%	5,400	50.54%	77	0.72%	-192	-1.80%	10,685
Butts	3,274	27.80%	8,406	71.38%	96	0.82%	-5,132	-43.58%	11,776
Calhoun	1,263	57.46%	923	41.99%	12	0.55%	340	15.47%	2,198
Camden	7,967	33.62%	15,249	64.35%	482	2.03%	-7,282	-30.73%	23,698
Candler	1,269	28.64%	3,133	70.71%	29	0.65%	-1,864	-42.07%	4,431
Carroll	16,236	29.79%	37,476	68.76%	790	1.45%	-21,240	-38.97%	54,502
Catoosa	6,932	21.25%	25,167	77.14%	527	1.61%	-18,235	-55.89%	32,626
Charlton	1,105	24.19%	3,419	74.85%	44	0.96%	-2,314	-50.66%	4,568
Chatham	78,247	58.62%	53,232	39.88%	2,005	1.50%	25,015	18.74%	133,484
Chattahoochee	667	42.16%	880	55.63%	35	2.21%	-213	-13.47%	1,582
Chattooga	1,854	18.44%	8,064	80.21%	135	1.35%	-6,210	-61.77%	10,053
Cherokee	42,779	29.53%	99,585	68.75%	2,495	1.72%	-56,806	-39.22%	144,859
Clarke	36,055	70.12%	14,450	28.10%	916	1.78%	21,605	42.02%	51,421
Clay	791	55.08%	637	44.36%	8	0.56%	154	10.72%	1,436
Clayton	95,466	84.94%	15,811	14.07%	1,114	0.99%	79,655	70.87%	112,391
Clinch	744	26.00%	2,105	73.55%	13	0.45%	-1,361	-47.55%	2,862
Cobb	221,847	56.30%	165,436	41.99%	6,739	1.71%	56,411	14.31%	394,022
Coffee	4,511	29.65%	10,578	69.53%	125	0.82%	-6,067	-39.88%	15,214
Colquitt	4,190	26.05%	11,777	73.21%	120	0.74%	-7,587	-47.16%	16,087
Columbia	29,232	36.26%	50,013	62.04%	1,375	1.70%	-20,781	-25.78%	80,620
Cook	2,059	29.26%	4,900	69.63%	78	1.11%	-2,841	-40.37%	7,037
Coweta	24,210	31.50%	51,501	67.02%	1,134	1.48%	-27,291	-35.52%	76,845
Crawford	1,615	26.47%	4,428	72.57%	59	0.96%	-2,813	-46.10%	6,102
Crisp	2,982	37.11%	4,985	62.03%	69	0.86%	-2,003	-24.92%	8,036
Dade	1,261	16.93%	6,066	81.46%	120	1.61%	-4,805	-64.53%	7,447
Dawson	2,486	15.46%	13,398	83.30%	200	1.24%	-10,912	-67.84%	16,084
Decatur	4,782	41.12%	6,755	58.09%	91	0.79%	-1,973	-16.97%	11,628
DeKalb	308,162	83.09%	58,377	15.74%	4,338	1.17%	249,785	67.35%	370,877
Dodge	2,172	26.91%	5,843	72.39%	57	0.70%	-3,671	-45.48%	8,072
Dooly	1,911	46.54%	2,159	52.58%	36	0.88%	-248	-6.04%	4,106
Dougherty	24,568	69.62%	10,441	29.59%	281	0.79%	14,127	40.03%	35,290
Douglas	42,814	61.92%	25,454	36.82%	871	1.26%	17,360	25.10%	69,139
Early	2,450	47.22%	2,710	52.24%	28	0.54%	-260	-5.02%	5,188
Echols	167	11.58%	1,256	87.10%	19	1.32%	-1,089	-75.52%	1,442
Effingham	7,718	24.44%	23,361	73.98%	500	1.58%	-15,643	-49.54%	31,579
Elbert	2,879	31.38%	6,226	67.85%	71	0.77%	-3,347	-36.47%	9,176
Emanuel	2,886	30.36%	6,553	68.93%	68	0.71%	-3,667	-38.57%	9,507
Evans	1,324	31.17%	2,888	67.98%	36	0.85%	-1,564	-36.81%	4,248
Fannin	2,570	17.31%	12,169	81.95%	110	0.74%	-9,599	-64.64%	14,849
Fayette	33,062	45.91%	37,956	52.71%	994	1.38%	-4,894	-6.80%	72,012
Floyd	11,917	28.81%	28,906	69.88%	542	1.31%	-16,989	-41.07%	41,365
Forsyth	42,208	32.62%	85,123	65.79%	2,046	1.59%	-42,915	-33.17%	129,377
Franklin	1,593	14.80%	9,069	84.23%	105	0.97%	-7,476	-69.43%	10,767
Fulton	380,212	72.57%	137,247	26.20%	6,472	1.23%	242,965	46.37%	523,931
Gilmer	2,932	17.74%	13,429	81.25%	166	1.01%	-10,497	-63.51%	16,527
Glascock	155	9.90%	1,402	89.58%	8	0.52%	-1,247	-79.68%	1,565
Glynn	15,882	37.82%	25,617	61.00%	495	1.18%	-9,735	-23.18%	41,994
Gordon	4,384	18.23%	19,405	80.71%	255	1.06%	-15,021	-62.48%	24,044
Grady	3,619	33.80%	7,034	65.70%	54	0.50%	-3,415	-31.90%	10,707
Greene	4,087	36.34%	7,066	62.83%	94	0.83%	-2,979	-26.49%	11,247
Gwinnett	241,994	58.40%	166,400	40.16%	5,956	1.44%	75,594	18.24%	414,350
Habersham	3,562	17.42%	16,637	81.39%	243	1.19%	-13,075	-63.97%	20,442
Hall	25,033	27.63%	64,183	70.84%	1,386	1.53%	-39,150	-43.21%	90,602
Hancock	2,976	71.66%	1,154	27.79%	23	0.55%	1,822	43.87%	4,153
Haralson	1,791	12.57%	12,330	86.54%	127	0.89%	-10,539	-73.97%	14,248
Harris	5,457	27.28%	14,319	71.59%	226	1.13%	-8,862	-44.31%	20,002
Hart	3,157	24.79%	9,465	74.33%	112	0.88%	-6,308	-49.54%	12,734
Heard	824	15.28%	4,519	83.78%	51	0.94%	-3,695	-68.50%	5,394
Henry	73,443	59.70%	48,259	39.23%	1,314	1.07%	25,184	20.47%	123,016
Houston	32,239	43.06%	41,540	55.48%	1,093	1.46%	-9,301	-12.42%	74,872
Irwin	1,008	24.18%	3,134	75.19%	26	0.63%	-2,126	-51.01%	4,168
Jackson	7,642	20.28%	29,502	78.29%	541	1.43%	-21,860	-58.01%	37,685
Jasper	1,761	23.03%	5,822	76.13%	64	0.84%	-4,061	-53.10%	7,647
Jeff Davis	1,028	17.80%	4,695	81.31%	51	0.89%	-3,667	-63.51%	5,774
Jefferson	4,058	53.12%	3,537	46.30%	44	0.58%	521	6.82%	7,639
Jenkins	1,266	36.64%	2,161	62.55%	28	0.81%	-895	-25.91%	3,455
Johnson	1,222	29.80%	2,850	69.51%	28	0.69%	-1,628	-39.71%	4,100
Jones	4,882	32.68%	9,940	66.53%	118	0.79%	-5,038	-33.85%	14,940
Lamar	2,620	28.97%	6,331	69.99%	94	1.04%	-3,711	-41.02%	9,045
Lanier	1,019	28.50%	2,509	70.16%	48	1.34%	-1,490	-41.66%	3,576
Laurens	8,074	35.52%	14,493	63.76%	165	0.72%	-6,419	-28.24%	22,732
Lee	4,558	27.26%	12,007	71.82%	154	0.92%	-7,449	-44.56%	16,719
Liberty	13,104	61.25%	7,959	37.20%	331	1.55%	5,145	24.05%	21,394
Lincoln	1,432	30.86%	3,173	68.37%	36	0.77%	-1,741	-37.51%	4,641
Long	2,035	35.95%	3,527	62.31%	98	1.74%	-1,492	-26.36%	5,660
Lowndes	20,116	43.38%	25,692	55.40%	567	1.22%	-5,576	-12.02%	46,375
Lumpkin	3,126	20.11%	12,163	78.24%	256	1.65%	-9,037	-58.13%	15,545
Macon	2,858	61.29%	1,783	38.24%	22	0.47%	1,075	23.05%	4,663
Madison	3,411	22.82%	11,326	75.78%	208	1.40%	-7,915	-52.96%	14,945
Marion	1,312	36.18%	2,275	62.74%	39	1.08%	-963	-26.56%	3,626
McDuffie	4,168	39.86%	6,169	59.00%	119	1.14%	-2,001	-19.14%	10,456
McIntosh	2,612	39.01%	4,016	59.98%	68	1.01%	-1,404	-20.97%	6,696
Meriwether	4,287	39.40%	6,524	59.96%	69	0.64%	-2,237	-20.56%	10,880
Miller	748	26.39%	2,066	72.90%	20	0.71%	-1,318	-46.51%	2,834
Mitchell	3,993	44.55%	4,935	55.06%	35	0.39%	-942	-10.51%	8,963
Monroe	4,385	28.12%	11,057	70.91%	150	0.97%	-6,672	-42.79%	15,592
Montgomery	980	24.70%	2,960	74.60%	28	0.70%	-1,980	-49.90%	3,968
Morgan	3,353	28.63%	8,231	70.29%	126	1.08%	-4,878	-41.66%	11,710
Murray	2,301	14.95%	12,944	84.08%	150	0.97%	-10,643	-69.13%	15,395
Muscogee	49,446	61.40%	30,107	37.39%	975	1.21%	19,339	24.01%	80,528
Newton	29,789	54.90%	23,869	43.99%	605	1.11%	5,920	10.91%	54,263
Oconee	8,162	32.40%	16,595	65.87%	436	1.73%	-8,433	-33.47%	25,193
Oglethorpe	2,439	29.97%	5,592	68.71%	107	1.32%	-3,153	-38.74%	8,138
Paulding	29,695	34.76%	54,517	63.82%	1,205	1.42%	-24,822	-29.06%	85,417
Peach	5,922	47.17%	6,506	51.82%	126	1.01%	-584	-4.65%	12,554
Pickens	2,824	16.45%	14,110	82.17%	238	1.38%	-11,286	-65.72%	17,172
Pierce	1,100	12.16%	7,898	87.29%	50	0.55%	-6,798	-75.13%	9,048
Pike	1,505	14.04%	9,127	85.13%	89	0.83%	-7,622	-71.09%	10,721
Polk	3,657	21.02%	13,587	78.09%	155	0.89%	-9,930	-57.07%	17,399
Pulaski	1,230	30.14%	2,815	68.98%	36	0.88%	-1,585	-38.84%	4,081
Putnam	3,448	29.08%	8,291	69.92%	118	1.00%	-4,843	-40.84%	11,857
Quitman	497	44.94%	604	54.61%	5	0.45%	-107	-9.67%	1,106
Rabun	1,984	20.72%	7,474	78.07%	116	1.21%	-5,490	-57.35%	9,574
Randolph	1,671	54.38%	1,390	45.23%	12	0.39%	281	9.15%	3,073
Richmond	59,119	67.89%	26,780	30.75%	1,178	1.36%	32,339	37.14%	87,077
Rockdale	31,237	69.88%	13,014	29.11%	448	1.01%	18,223	40.77%	44,699
Schley	462	20.31%	1,800	79.12%	13	0.57%	-1,338	-58.81%	2,275
Screven	2,661	40.14%	3,915	59.06%	53	0.80%	-1,254	-18.92%	6,629
Seminole	1,256	32.30%	2,613	67.21%	19	0.49%	-1,357	-34.91%	3,888
Spalding	11,828	39.14%	18,104	59.91%	287	0.95%	-6,276	-20.77%	30,219
Stephens	2,386	20.08%	9,367	78.81%	132	1.11%	-6,981	-58.73%	11,885
Stewart	1,182	59.40%	801	40.25%	7	0.35%	381	19.15%	1,990
Sumter	6,314	51.97%	5,733	47.19%	103	0.84%	581	4.78%	12,150
Talbot	2,114	59.99%	1,392	39.50%	18	0.51%	722	20.49%	3,524
Taliaferro	561	60.45%	360	38.79%	7	0.76%	201	21.66%	928
Tattnall	2,062	25.19%	6,054	73.95%	71	0.86%	-3,992	-48.76%	8,187
Taylor	1,388	36.13%	2,420	62.99%	34	0.88%	-1,032	-26.86%	3,842
Telfair	1,488	34.33%	2,825	65.17%	22	0.50%	-1,337	-30.84%	4,335
Terrell	2,376	53.80%	2,004	45.38%	36	0.82%	372	8.42%	4,416
Thomas	8,708	39.80%	12,969	59.28%	200	0.92%	-4,261	-19.48%	21,877
Tift	5,318	32.67%	10,784	66.24%	178	1.09%	-5,466	-33.57%	16,280
Toombs	2,938	26.92%	7,873	72.14%	103	0.94%	-4,935	-45.22%	10,914
Towns	1,550	19.43%	6,384	80.01%	45	0.56%	-4,834	-60.58%	7,979
Treutlen	952	30.94%	2,101	68.28%	24	0.78%	-1,149	-37.34%	3,077
Troup	11,577	38.52%	18,142	60.36%	338	1.12%	-6,565	-21.84%	30,057
Turner	1,409	37.17%	2,349	61.96%	33	0.87%	-940	-24.79%	3,791
Twiggs	2,044	45.99%	2,370	53.33%	30	0.68%	-326	-7.34%	4,444
Union	2,800	17.99%	12,650	81.29%	112	0.72%	-9,850	-63.30%	15,562
Upson	4,203	32.56%	8,606	66.68%	98	0.76%	-4,403	-34.12%	12,907
Walker	5,770	19.64%	23,173	78.89%	431	1.47%	-17,403	-59.25%	29,374
Walton	12,683	24.82%	37,839	74.05%	576	1.13%	-25,156	-49.23%	51,098
Ware	4,169	29.38%	9,903	69.79%	117	0.83%	-5,734	-40.41%	14,189
Warren	1,468	55.40%	1,166	44.00%	16	0.60%	302	11.40%	2,650
Washington	4,743	50.03%	4,668	49.24%	69	0.73%	75	0.79%	9,480
Wayne	2,688	21.03%	9,987	78.13%	107	0.84%	-7,299	-57.10%	12,782
Webster	640	46.01%	748	53.77%	3	0.22%	-108	-7.76%	1,391
Wheeler	689	30.15%	1,583	69.28%	13	0.57%	-894	-39.13%	2,285
White	2,411	16.26%	12,222	82.41%	198	1.33%	-9,811	-66.15%	14,831
Whitfield	10,680	29.05%	25,644	69.75%	442	1.20%	-14,964	-40.70%	36,766
Wilcox	861	26.26%	2,402	73.25%	16	0.49%	-1,541	-46.99%	3,279
Wilkes	2,160	42.93%	2,823	56.11%	48	0.96%	-663	-13.18%	5,031
Wilkinson	2,074	43.48%	2,665	55.87%	31	0.65%	-591	-12.39%	4,770
Worth	2,395	25.79%	6,830	73.56%	60	0.65%	-4,435	-47.77%	9,285
Totals	2,473,633	49.47%	2,461,854	49.24%	64,473	1.29%	11,779	0.23%	4,999,960

Counties that flipped from Democratic to Republican

- Burke (largest city: Waynesboro)

==== By congressional district ====
Despite losing the state, Trump won eight of 14 congressional districts.

District	Biden	Trump	Elected Representative
1st	43%	56%	Buddy Carter
2nd	56%	43%	Sanford Bishop
3rd	37%	62%	Drew Ferguson
4th	79%	20%	Hank Johnson
5th	86%	13%	Nikema Williams
6th	55%	44%	Lucy McBath
7th	52%	46%	Carolyn Bourdeaux
8th	37%	62%	Austin Scott
9th	22%	76%	Andrew Clyde
10th	39%	60%	Jody Hice
11th	42%	57%	Barry Loudermilk
12th	43%	56%	Rick W. Allen
13th	76%	23%	David Scott
14th	25%	73%	Marjorie Taylor Greene

== Analysis ==
Like its fellow Deep South neighbors, Georgia is a former Solid South state that had gradually become part of the red wall since the Reagan Revolution starting in 1984. While Southerner Bill Clinton carried the state in 1992 and nearly did again in 1996, Georgia became a strongly red state in 2000 and 2004, and a moderately red state from 2008 to 2016.

Demographic changes and population shifts made Georgia trend towards being a purple state, starting in 2016; Donald Trump carried Georgia by just over 5 points against Hillary Clinton. Further signalling Georgia's blue shift were the state 2018 midterms, where Democrat Stacey Abrams nearly won the governor's race against Republican Brian Kemp.

Biden became the first Democratic presidential nominee to win the state since Bill Clinton in 1992; the first to win any statewide election in Georgia since 2006; the first to carry a state in the Deep South since Clinton won Louisiana in 1996; and the first to gain over 70% of the vote in Fulton County since Franklin D. Roosevelt in 1944. He was also the first non-Southern Democrat to carry a state in the Deep South since Kennedy in 1960.

This is the first time since 1992 that Georgia voted more Democratic than neighboring Florida and the first time since 2000 that it voted more Democratic than also-neighboring North Carolina. Additionally, it was the first time since 1860 that Laurens County and Monroe County did not vote for the statewide winner. Biden also became the first Democrat to win the White House without carrying Baker, Burke, Dooly, Peach, Quitman, or Twiggs counties since Lyndon B. Johnson in 1964.

Georgia was one of two states that Obama (whom Biden served under as VP) lost in both 2008 and 2012 that Biden carried, the other state being Arizona.

Georgia weighed in for this election as 4.2% more Republican than the nation-at-large. Georgia marked the strongest leftward shift in a state that Trump carried in 2016, as the state's PVI shifted 3 points more Democratic since then.

Georgia's trend towards the Democrats can be partly explained by the growth of the Atlanta metropolitan area. Atlanta has attracted many transplants from heavily blue-leaning areas of the United States. Additionally, the state's population is diversifying faster than that of most states, with the population of African Americans, Latinos, and Asians all growing over the last 10 years, and these blocs generally lean Democratic. As is the case in most southern states, there was a stark racial divide in voting for this election. White Georgians supported Trump by 69%-30%, while Black Georgians supported Biden by 88%-11%. However, White Georgians with college degrees supported Trump by a reduced 55%-44%.

In what was likely the biggest key to Biden's victory in Georgia, the Democratic Party invested heavily in the state, with activist and gubernatorial candidate Stacey Abrams heading an effort to boost minority turnout, especially among African-American voters. The Democratic super PAC Priorities USA focused on Georgia near the end of the 2020 campaign, even sending former president Barack Obama to campaign in the state. Black voters made up 29% of the electorate, and Latinos made up about 7%, a significant increase compared to previous years.

Biden performed well across the board; he won independent voters by 9 points, and was able to pick up 6% of Republican voters in the state. Biden also won young voters in Georgia, sweeping each age group under 50 years old. Trump's strength in the state came from Southern whites—mainly those outside of Atlanta's urban area—as he easily won those without a college degree, especially in Georgia's rural areas; his vote share with college-educated whites dropped, however, and Trump only won suburban Georgia by 3 points this cycle.

Outside of Atlanta, Biden's strongest performances came in Georgia's other urban and suburban areas, such as Chatham County (Savannah), Muscogee County (Columbus), Richmond County (Augusta), Bibb County (Macon), and majority-college educated Clarke County (Athens). Trump, on the other hand, performed strongest in the northern and southeastern parts of the state, which are rural and were historically a hotbed for Dixiecrats. Following the nationwide trend, Georgia's voting patterns were split between urban, suburban and rural areas. Biden won urban areas by 35 points, while Trump carried the suburbs by 3 points, and these areas combined made up 85% of the electorate, showing the rapidly evolving demographics of Georgia. Trump carried rural areas by 39 points.

=== Voter demographics ===
Edison Research exit poll
Demographic subgroup	Biden	Trump	No Answer	% of Voters
Ideology
Liberal	87	12	1	22
Moderate	65	33	2	38
Conservative	14	86	N/A	40
Party
Democrat	96	4	N/A	34
Republican	6	94	N/A	38
Independent	53	44	3	28
Gender
Men	43	55	2	44
Women	54	45	1	56
Race
White	30	69	1	61
Black	88	11	1	29
Latino	62	37	1	7
Asian	N/A	N/A	N/A	1
Other	58	38	N/A	2
Gender by race/ethnicity
White men	27	72	1	29
White women	32	67	N/A	33
Black men	83	16	1	11
Black women	92	7	1	17
Latino men (of any race)	51	48	1	3
Latino women (of any race)	69	30	1	4
All other races	59	38	3	3
White evangelical or born-again Christian
White evangelical or born-again Christian	14	85	1	33
Everyone else	70	29	1	67
Age
18–24 years old	56	43	1	12
25–29 years old	56	43	1	8
30–39 years old	53	45	2	17
40–49 years old	50	49	1	18
50–64 years old	47	53	N/A	27
65 and older	44	56	N/A	19
Sexual orientation
LGBT	64	34	2	7
Heterosexual	47	52	1	93
First time voter
First time voter	52	45	3	13
Everyone else	48	52	N/A	87
Education
High school or less	35	64	1	16
Some college education	49	49	2	26
Associate degree	46	53	1	17
Bachelor's degree	54	45	1	26
Advanced degree	63	36	1	14
Education by race/ethnicity
White college graduates	44	55	1	26
White no college degree	20	79	1	35
Non-white college graduates	83	16	1	14
Non-white no college degree	80	19	1	25
Income
Under $30,000	59	38	3	13
$30,000–49,999	53	45	3	19
$50,000–99,999	46	53	1	36
$100,000–199,999	50	50	0	23
Over $200,000	63	35	2	8
Family's financial situation today
Better than four years ago	21	78	1	44
Worse than four years ago	84	15	1	16
About the same	73	26	1	38
U.S. Military Service
Yes	38	61	1	15
No	50	49	1	85
Region
North	28	70	2	19
Atlanta Suburbs	53	46	1	28
Atlanta Metro	80	19	1	20
Central	44	55	1	18
Coast/South	38	61	1	15
Area type
Urban	67	32	1	23
Suburban	48	51	1	62
Rural	30	69	1	14
Source: CNN

== Aftermath ==
=== Statewide audit and recount ===
On November 11, the Secretary of State of Georgia announced there would be a statewide hand recount of every paper ballot in addition to the normal audit process. On November 15, Georgia Secretary of State Brad Raffensperger, a Republican, denounced Trump's criticism of the state's recount process. During this hand recount, it was discovered that Fayette County had missed tabulating 2,755 votes, Floyd County had about 2,600 ballots that were never scanned, Douglas County failed to include a memory card from an Election Day precinct that included 156 votes, and Walton County discovered a memory card with 284 votes. The final statewide result from the completed hand recount is Biden with 2,475,141 votes and Trump with 2,462,857 votes, a spread of 12,284 votes. The result before the hand recount had been Biden with 2,473,383 votes and Trump with 2,459,825. Therefore, the hand recount netted Trump 1,274 votes. The change in the count was due to a number of human errors, including memory cards that did not upload properly to the state servers, and was not attributable to any fraud in the original tally.

The results of the election were officially certified on November 20, 2020.

The Trump campaign had until November 24, 2020, to request a machine recount of the results. Unlike the statewide audit of each individual ballot by hand, the machine recount would involve a re-scanning of the voting machines. They filed a petition formally seeking the machine recount on November 21.

On December 2, Raffensperger suggested that Biden would likely win the machine recount. Biden was later confirmed as the winner of the machine recount on December 7.

=== Disputes ===
On November 19, Judge Steven D. Grimberg, a federal judge who was appointed by Trump in 2019, denied the Trump campaign's request to have further delay in the certification of the election results in Georgia.

On November 30, Gabriel Sterling, a top Republican election official for the Republican Georgia Secretary of State, gave a press conference in which he denounced death threats made against an election technician. Sterling appealed to President Trump: "Stop inspiring people to commit potential acts of violence. Someone's going to get hurt, someone's going to get shot, someone's going to get killed, and it's not right."

On December 14, 2020, Georgia's electoral votes were cast for Biden, formalizing his victory in the state, which Biden won by 11,779 votes. On the same day, a group of pro-Trump Republicans claimed to cast Georgia's electoral votes for Trump; the fake votes have no legal standing.

On January 2, 2021, Trump and Raffensperger spoke for one hour by telephone, during which Trump threatened Raffensperger by saying he was taking "a big risk" by declaring Biden as the victor. Referring to Biden's 11,779-vote victory margin, Trump instructed Raffensperger that "there's nothing wrong with saying, you know, um, that you've recalculated...I just want to find 11,780 votes."

On May 21, 2021, a Henry County Superior Court Judge, Brian Amero, agreed to unseal 147,000 absentee ballots from Fulton County. The petitioners in the case alleged that fraud had occurred – based on sworn affidavits provided by four election workers who all claimed to have handled thousands of fraudulent ballots. Secretary of State Brad Raffensperger welcomed the decision. "Fulton County has a long-standing history of election mismanagement that has understandably weakened voters' faith in its system. Allowing this audit provides another layer of transparency and citizen engagement." However, on June 25, 2021, Amero dismissed most of the lawsuit seeking to inspect the ballots. On October 13, Amero dismissed the suit altogether, closing the last legal challenge to Georgia election results, ruling the suit lacked standing because it "failed to allege a particularized injury."

On May 2, 2022, Raffensperger tweeted a link to a Just the News article outlining how Georgia election regulators have issued four subpoenas demanding the identity of a John Doe whistleblower and other evidence concerning an alleged ballot trafficking operation in the 2020 election. The subpoenas were sent to a Conservative election denial group True the Vote, who earlier provided information to Georgia officials that as many as 242 people (dubbed mules) illegally gathered third-party ballots during the battleground state's November 2020 election and subsequent U.S. Senate races and then stuffed the ballots into multiple mail-in-ballot drop boxes in numerous locations around the state. "Credible evidence was given to us that people were harvesting ballots," said Raffensperger to The National Desk's Jan Jeffcoat. "This information was provided to us and they said there's a witness, a 'John Doe.' And so we're looking at subpoenaing that person to get the information." Georgia's Election Board sued True the Vote to enforce that subpoena, and True the Vote filed in response that it actually could not provide any name, contact information or other documentary evidence sought by the subpoena.

On August 15, 2022, it was announced that Rudolph W. "Rudy" Giuliani is a target of the Georgia election probe. On the same day, a federal judge, District Court Judge Leigh Martin May, ordered that Lindsey Graham testify before the grand jury.

The Atlanta Journal Constitution found about 3,000 too many absentee votes counted for Biden as identified by investigators during the 2020 Fulton County audit. These duplicate ballots were not used as Georgia's certified vote count. The recount of five million ballots cast in Georgia also uncovered almost 6,000 ballots in four counties overlooked in the initial tally, which resulted in Trump gaining 1,400 votes as well as almost 500 votes in the manual tally, a total of around 1,900 votes. Biden also gained 975 votes in the manual recount, however, and given the difference in the manual recount it netted Biden an additional 505 votes.

The breakdown of the manual recount was as follows:

Clayton County: +145 Trump

Cobb County: +315 Biden

DeKalb County: +560 Biden

Fulton County: +345 Trump

Gwinnett County: +285 Trump

Georgia: +496 Trump

12,284: Joe Biden's advantage over Donald Trump in a manual recount

12,780: Machine-counted margin between the candidates

11,779: Officially certified margin of Victory for Joseph R. Biden

While these finds did not change the overall outcome, it did reveal a number of errors that had been made in the initial counts in a number of counties, which would later prompt Governor Kemp to order a probe into the "sloppy" initial counts from Fulton County.

=== Prosecution of Donald Trump ===
Trump would engage in unsuccessful attempts to overturn the results, challenging Raffensperger in a widely publicized phone call to "find" 11,780 more votes, the exact number he needed to win the state. Actions taken by Trump allies in Georgia, including a scheme to send fake electors to Congress, are currently under criminal investigation, which has thus far led to a criminal indictment against Trump and his allies.

In 2023, Donald Trump was accused of leading a "criminal racketeering enterprise" with 18 co-defendants who are accused of having "knowingly and willfully joined a conspiracy to unlawfully change the outcome" of the election. Trump and the other co-defendants are being charged under the Racketeer Influenced and Corrupt Organizations Act. The indictment comes in the context of various attempts to overturn the 2020 United States presidential election by Trump. The case was set to be tried in the Fulton County Superior Court with judge Scott F. McAfee presiding. However, after Fani Willis was disqualified due to unethical personal and professional behaviour. Peter Skandalakis took over as prosecutor. Skandalakis chose not to proceed with the charges, thereby ending the case.

== See also ==
- United States presidential elections in Georgia
- Voter suppression in the United States 2019–2020: Georgia
- 2020 United States presidential election
- 2020 Democratic Party presidential primaries
- 2020 Republican Party presidential primaries
- 2020 United States elections

== Notes ==
Partisan clients
