= 1880 Georgia gubernatorial election =

- October 6, 1880
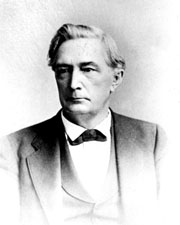

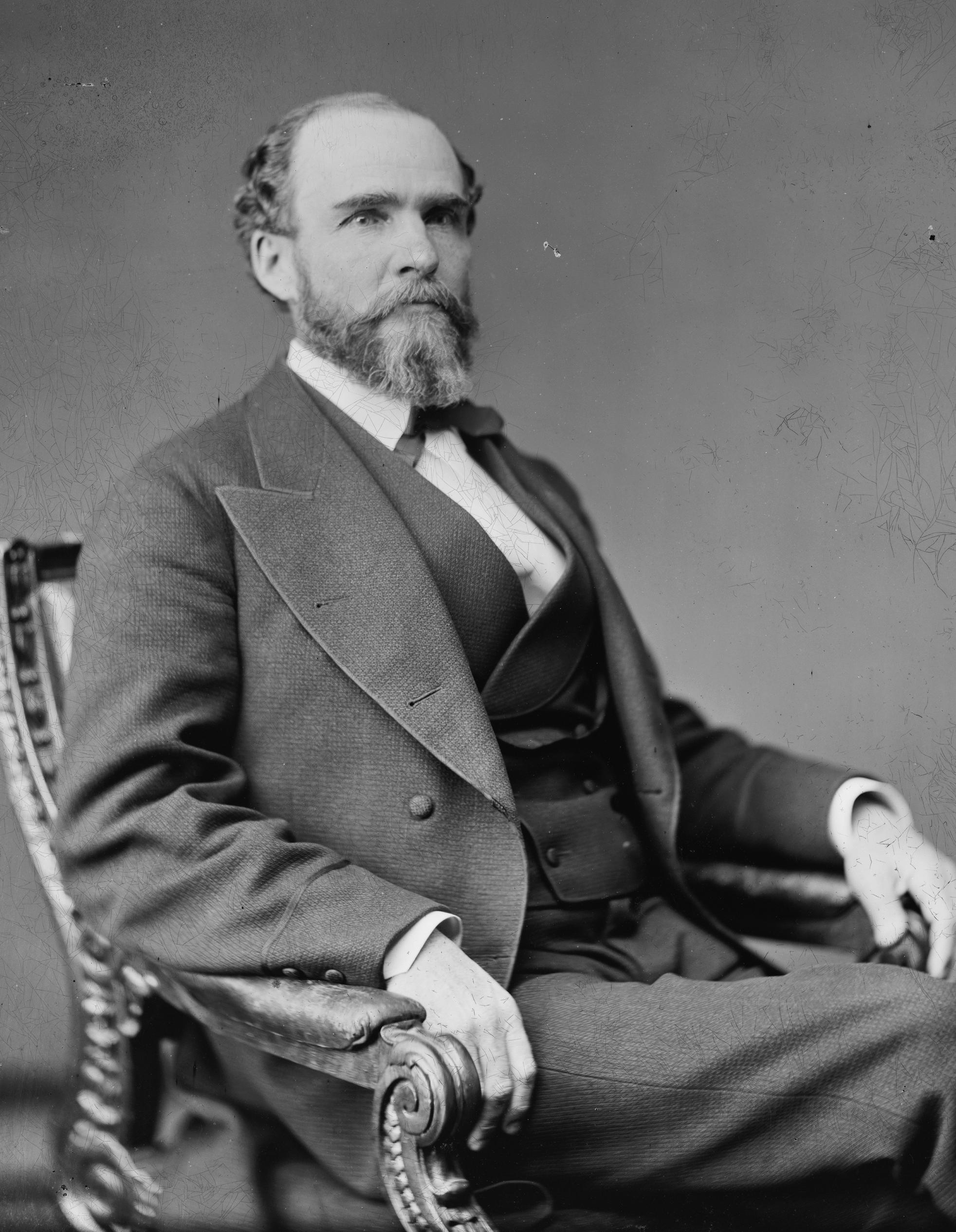
Nominee	Alfred H. Colquitt	Thomas M. Norwood
Party	Democratic	Independent Democrat
Popular vote	118,349	64,004
Percentage	64.90%	35.10%
- Results by County: Colquitt: 50–60% 60–70% 70–80% 80–90% >90% Norwood: 50–60% 60–70% 70–80% 80–90% No Data
Governor before election
Alfred H. Colquitt
Democratic
Elected Governor
Alfred H. Colquitt
Democratic

The 1880 Georgia gubernatorial election was held on October 6, 1880, in order to elect the Governor of Georgia. Democratic nominee and incumbent Governor Alfred H. Colquitt defeated Independent Democratic nominee and former United States Senator from Georgia Thomas M. Norwood.

== General election ==
On election day, October 6, 1880, Democratic nominee Alfred H. Colquitt won re-election by a margin of 54,345 votes against his opponent Independent Democratic nominee Thomas M. Norwood, thereby holding Democratic control over the office of Governor. Colquitt was sworn in for his second term on January 12, 1881.

=== Results ===
Georgia gubernatorial election, 1880
Party	Candidate	Votes	%
Democratic	Alfred H. Colquitt (incumbent)	118,349	64.90
Independent Democrat	Thomas M. Norwood	64,004	35.10
Total votes		182,353	100.00
Democratic hold			
