= Pope Barrow =

American politician

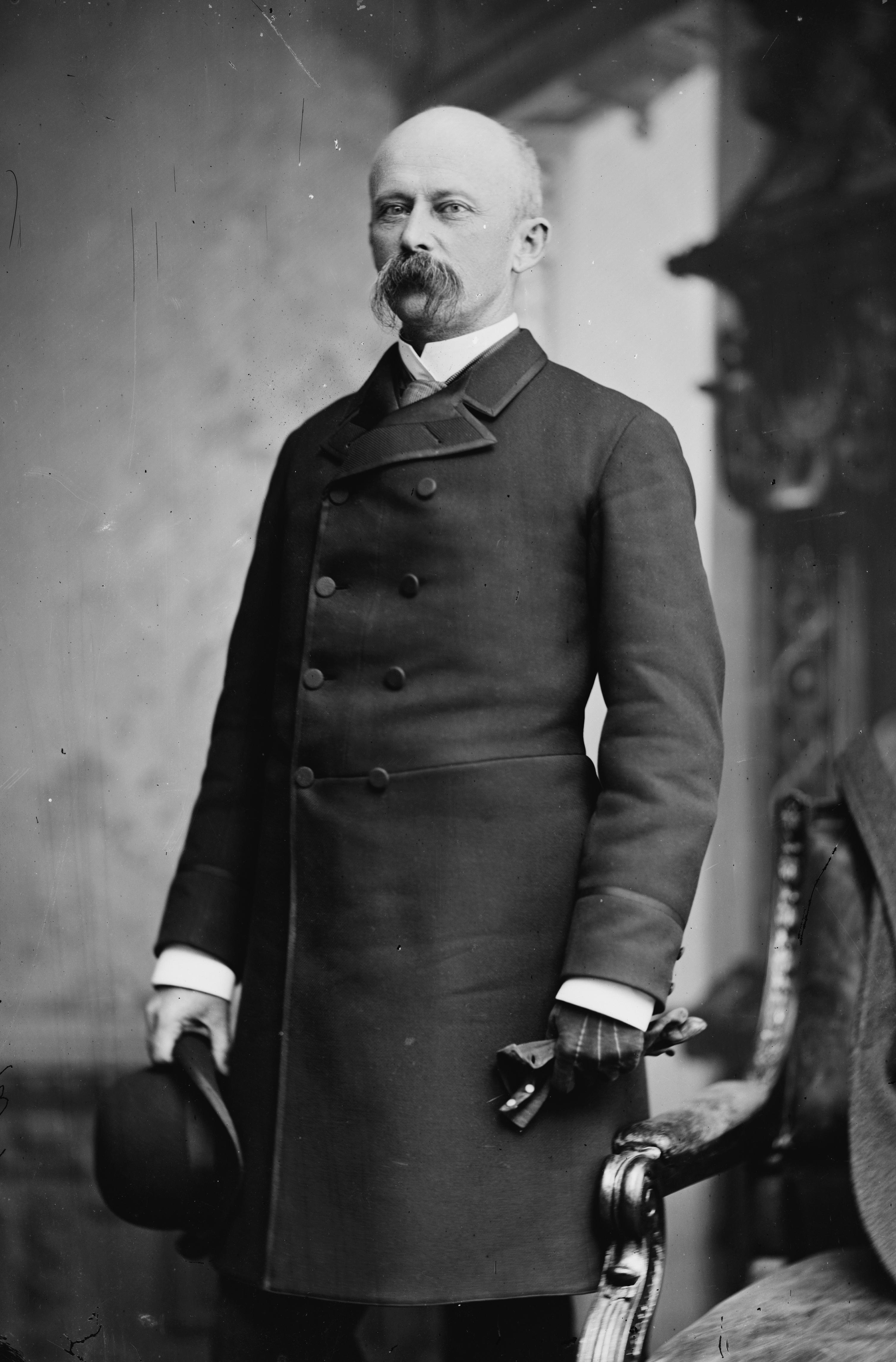

United States Senator from Georgia
- In office November 15, 1882 – March 3, 1883
- Preceded by: Benjamin H. Hill
- Succeeded by: Alfred H. Colquitt

Member of the Georgia House of Representatives
- In office 1880–1881

Personal details
- Born: August 1, 1839 Oglethorpe County, Georgia, US
- Died: December 23, 1903 (aged 64) Savannah, Georgia, US
- Party: Democratic
- Relations: Wilson Lumpkin; David Crenshaw Barrow, Jr.
- Children: Craig Barrow

Middleton Pope Barrow (August 1, 1839 – December 23, 1903) was a United States senator from Georgia. Born near Antioch, Georgia, in Oglethorpe County, he attended a private academy and graduated from the University of Georgia (UGA) in Athens, Georgia, with a Bachelor of Arts in 1859 and from the School of Law in 1860. He was admitted to the bar that year and commenced practice in Athens.

During the Civil War, he entered the Confederate service in 1861 and served throughout the war. He resumed the practice of law in Athens and was a member of the State constitutional convention in 1877.

Barrow was a member of the Georgia House of Representatives from 1880 to 1881 and was elected as a Democrat to the U.S. Senate in 1882 to fill the vacancy caused by the death of Benjamin H. Hill, serving from November 15, 1882, to March 3, 1883. He was not a candidate for re-election, and resumed the practice of law in Athens.

From January 6, 1902, until his death, he was a judge of the eastern judicial circuit of Georgia, and died in Savannah, Georgia, in December 1903; interment was in a private cemetery on the family plantation in Oglethorpe County.

Pope Barrow was a great-grandson of Wilson Lumpkin, a U.S. Senator and a Governor of Georgia, as well as a great-grandfather of U.S. Representative John Barrow. Pope's younger brother, David Crenshaw Barrow, Jr., served as the chancellor of UGA from 1906 until 1925, and Pope Barrow served as a trustee of the university from 1872 until 1889.

His son, Craig, was a noted physician in Georgia.

U.S. Senate
| Preceded by Benjamin H. Hill | U.S. senator (Class 2) from Georgia; 1882–1883; Served alongside: Joseph E. Brown | Succeeded by Alfred H. Colquitt |
