= Craig Barrow =

American physician (1876–1945)

- Born: May 12, 1876; Athens, Georgia, U.S.
- Died: August 31, 1945 (aged 69); Savannah, Georgia, U.S.
- Resting place: Wormsloe burial ground, near Savannah, Georgia, U.S.
- Occupation: Physician
- Father: Middleton Pope Barrow

Craig Barrow (May 12, 1876 – August 31, 1945) was an American physician. He served as the chief surgeon of the Central of Georgia Railway.

== Life and career ==
Barrow was born in 1876 in Athens, Georgia, to Middleton Pope Barrow and Sarah Church Craig. His father represented the State of Georgia in the United States Senate.

He graduated from the University of Georgia in 1896 and the University of Maryland medical school in 1900 and undertook postgraduate studies at the University of Breslau in Breslau, Germany.

In 1902, he began medical practice as a surgeon in Savannah, Georgia, where he worked at the Georgia Infirmary for 36 years and was involved in the establishment of the Central of Georgia Hospital in 1927. He was also head physician in the children's department of the Telfair Hospital.

He married twice; firstly, to Alice Barker, who died in 1903, then, in 1906, to Elfrida De Renne, a direct descendant of Georgia colonist Noble Jones. He had three children with Elfrida: Craig Jr., Elfrida and Muriel. In 1938, the family moved to Wormsloe, the plantation established by Jones two hundred years earlier. They also owned Yonholme, a summer home in Hendersonville, North Carolina.

== Death ==
Barrow died in 1945, aged 69, having undergone an unsuccessful operation at the Central of Georgia Hospital. He was interred at Wormsloe burial ground. His widow, Elfrida, survived him by 25 years and was buried beside him upon her death.

=== Legacy ===
In 2004, Craig Barrow III, son of Craig Barrow Jr., established the Craig Barrow Fund to honor his father and grandfather.
