= E. A. Nisbet =

American politician and judge (1803–1871)

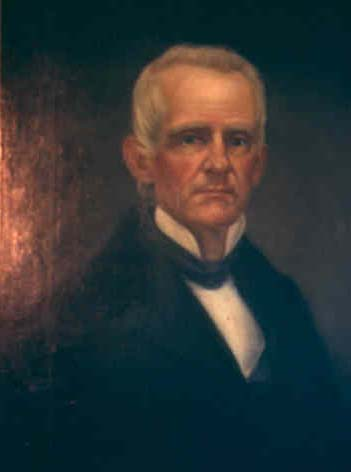
- In office March 4, 1839 – October 12, 1841
- Preceded by: Seaton Grantland
- Succeeded by: Walter T. Colquitt

Personal details
- Born: Eugenius Aristides Nisbet; December 7, 1803 near Union Point, Georgia, U.S.
- Died: March 18, 1871 (aged 67) Macon, Georgia, U.S.
- Resting place: Rose Hill Cemetery, Macon, Georgia, U.S.
- Education: University of South Carolina; University of Georgia (BA); Litchfield Law School
- Occupation: Politician, jurist, lawyer, judge

Eugenius Aristides Nisbet (December 7, 1803 – March 18, 1871) was an American politician, jurist, and lawyer.

== Biography ==
Nisbet was born near Union Point, Georgia. He attended the Powellton Academy in Hancock County, Georgia from 1815 to 1817, the University of South Carolina in Columbia from 1817 to 1819, and graduated from the University of Georgia in Athens with a Bachelor of Arts in 1821. Nisbet then attended the Litchfield Law School in Connecticut.

After receiving admission in 1824 to the state bar by a special act of the Georgia General Assembly as he was not yet 21, Nisbet began the practice of law in Madison, Georgia.

Nisbet was elected to the Georgia House of Representatives in 1827 and served until 1830 when he was elected to the Georgia Senate. He served in the state senate until 1837. Nisbet unsuccessfully ran for the U.S. House of Representatives in 1836; however, he was elected to that body in 1838 and again in 1840.

Nisbet resigned from the U.S. House in 1841, due to "the condition of his private affairs and a growing distaste for political life." Nisbet was later elected as one of the three initial justices of the Supreme Court of Georgia in 1845, and he served as an associate justice on that court until 1853. In 1861, Nisbet was a delegate to the Georgia Secession Convention and signed the Ordinance of Secession. He also ran an unsuccessful campaign to become Governor of Georgia in that same year. Nisbet served as a trustee of UGA from 1864 until his death in 1871 in Macon, Georgia. He was buried in that city's Rose Hill Cemetery.

== See also ==
- List of signers of the Georgia Ordinance of Secession

U.S. House of Representatives
Preceded by Seaton Grantland	Member of the U.S. House of Representatives from Georgia's at-large congressional district March 4, 1839 – October 12, 1841	Succeeded by Walter T. Colquitt
