= 6th Georgia Infantry Regiment =

Infantry regiment of the Confederate States Army

- Georgia State flag prior to 1879
- Active: 1861–April 26, 1865
- Country: Confederate States of America
- Allegiance: Georgia
- Branch: Confederate States Army
- Type: Infantry
- Engagements: American Civil War: Siege of Yorktown (1862); Battle of Seven Pines; Seven Days Battles (Gaines' Mill, Malvern Hill); Battle of South Mountain; Battle of Antietam; Battle of Fredericksburg; Battle of Chancellorsville; Battle of Grimball's Landing; Siege of Charleston Harbor; Battle of Olustee; Battle of Drewry's Bluff; Battle of Cold Harbor; Siege of Petersburg (The Crater, Chaffin's Farm); Second Battle of Fort Fisher; Battle of Bentonville

Commanders
- Notable commanders: Colonel Alfred H. Colquitt

The 6th Georgia Infantry Regiment was an infantry regiment in the Confederate States Army during the American Civil War. It was organized at Macon, Georgia, in April 1861.

Future governor of Georgia, Alfred H. Colquitt, was elected its first colonel. The regiment fought in the Battle of Fredericksburg, the Battle of Antietam and participated in Stonewall Jackson's flank attack at the Battle of Chancellorsville. The unit later saw action at battery Wagner near Charleston, South Carolina, and the Battle of Olustee near Ocean Pond, Florida. The remnants and survivors of the regiment surrendered at Greenboro, North Carolina on April 26, 1865, to forces under the command of William T. Sherman.

== Organization ==
=== Staff ===
- Colonels
  - Alfred Holt Colquitt
  - John T. Lofton
  - Sampson Watkins Harris

=== Companies ===
- A Company (Sydney Brown Infantry) was formed in Hancock County, Georgia.
- B Company (Lookout Dragoons) was formed in Dade County, Georgia.
- C Company (Beauregard Rifles or Beauregard Volunteers) was formed in Houston County, Georgia.
- D Company (Butts County Volunteers) was formed in Butts County, Georgia.
- E Company (Crawford County Greys or Crawford Greys) was formed in Crawford County, Georgia.
- F Company (Camilla Guards or Mitchell County Independents or Mitchell Independents) was formed in Mitchell County, Georgia.
- G Company (Butler Vanguards) was formed in Taylor County, Georgia.
- H Company (Baker Fire Eaters) was formed in Baker County, Georgia.
- I Company (Twiggs County Guards) was formed in Twiggs County, Georgia.
- K Company (Gilmer Blues) was formed in Oglethorpe County, Georgia.

== Battles ==
- Yorktown Siege, Virginia (4/62)Williamsburg, Virginia (5/5/62)
- Seven Pines, Virginia (5/31/62 - 6/1/62)
- Seven Days Battles, Virginia (6/25/62 - 7/1/62)
- Gaines’ Mill, Virginia (6/27/62)
- Malvern Hill, Virginia (7/1/62)
- South Mountain, Maryland (9/14/62)
- Antietam, Maryland (9/17/62)
- Fredericksburg, Virginia (12/13/62)
- Chancellorsville, Virginia (5/1/63 - 5/4/63)
- Grimball’s Landing, James Island, South Carolina (7/16/63)
- Charleston Harbor, South Carolina (8/63 - 9/63)
- Olustee, Florida (2/20/64)
- Drewry’s Bluff, Virginia (5/16/64)
- Petersburg Siege, Virginia (6/1/64 - 4/1/65)
- Cold Harbor, Virginia (6/1/64 - 6/3/64)
- Crater, Virginia (7/30/64)
- Fort Harrison, Virginia (9/29/64 - 9/30/64)
- Second Fort Fisher, North Carolina (1/13/65 - 1/15/65)
- Carolinas Campaign (2/65 - 4/30/65)
- Bentonville, North Carolina (3/19/65 - 3/21/65)

== See also ==
- List of Civil War regiments from Georgia
