= Peyton H. Colquitt =

Confederate Army officer

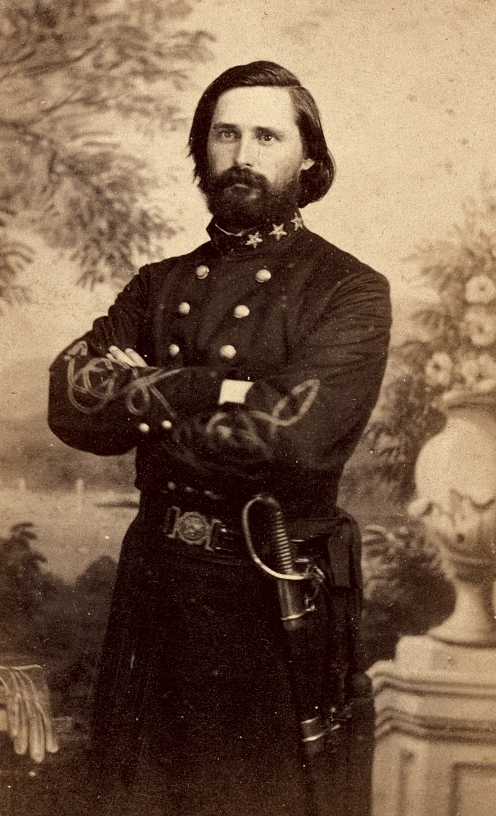
- Born: October 8, 1831
- Died: September 22, 1863 (aged 31); Chickamauga, Georgia
- Burial place: Linwood Cemetery; Columbus, Georgia
- Relatives: Walter T. Colquitt; Alfred Holt Colquitt
- Military career
- Allegiance: Confederate States
- Branch: Confederate States Army
- Service years: 1861–1863
- Rank: Colonel
- Commands: 46th Georgia Infantry Regiment; Gist's Brigade
- Conflicts: American Civil War: Battle of Sewell's Point; Battle of Chickamauga †

Peyton H. Colquitt (1831–1863) was a Confederate officer from Georgia during the American Civil War. A colonel of 46th Georgia Infantry Regiment, he was mortally wounded at the Battle of Chickamauga and died two days later.

== Biography ==
Peyton H. Colquitt was born October 7 (or 8), 1831, in Campbell County, Georgia, the second son of Walter T. Colquitt and his wife Nancy (Holt). His father was a circuit riding preacher who became a politician and was elected as a United States representative and then senator from Georgia. Peyton's older brother was Alfred Holt Colquitt, who would become a general in the Confederate Army, U.S. Senator from Georgia, and Governor of Georgia.

Peyton Colquitt attended a local academy before being admitted as a cadet at the United States Military Academy at West Point; he was a member of the class of 1853. He was turned back a year and resigned in 1853.

As 1863 obituary in an Augusta, Georgia newspaper states that he had been editor of the Columbus Times, and served as a representative and a senator in the Georgia Legislature.

In the American Civil War, Colquitt was commissioned as a captain of the Columbus Light Guard from Georgia. He fought in the second battle of the war, the Battle of Sewell's Point. He later commanded the 46th Georgia Infantry, organized in 1862. Colonel Colquitt served at the Battle of Chickamauga, where he was mortally wounded on September 20, 1863, commanding the brigade of States Rights Gist (Gist was acting as a division commander under Major General W. H. T. Walker, leading the Reserve Corps of the Army of Tennessee.) Colquitt died two days later.

Colquitt is buried in Linwood Cemetery in Columbus, Georgia. He was survived by his wife, Julia Flournoy (Hurt) Colquitt, who was buried nearby after her death in 1891, following her post-war romance in Paris with Jerome Napoleon Bonaparte II, a nephew of Emperor Napoleon III, and her second marriage to Leonidas A. Jordan, a wealthy resident of Macon, Georgia.

== Legacy and honors ==
After the war, a memorial to Colquitt was erected near where he fell at the Battle of Chickamauga.
