= Wormsloe burial ground =

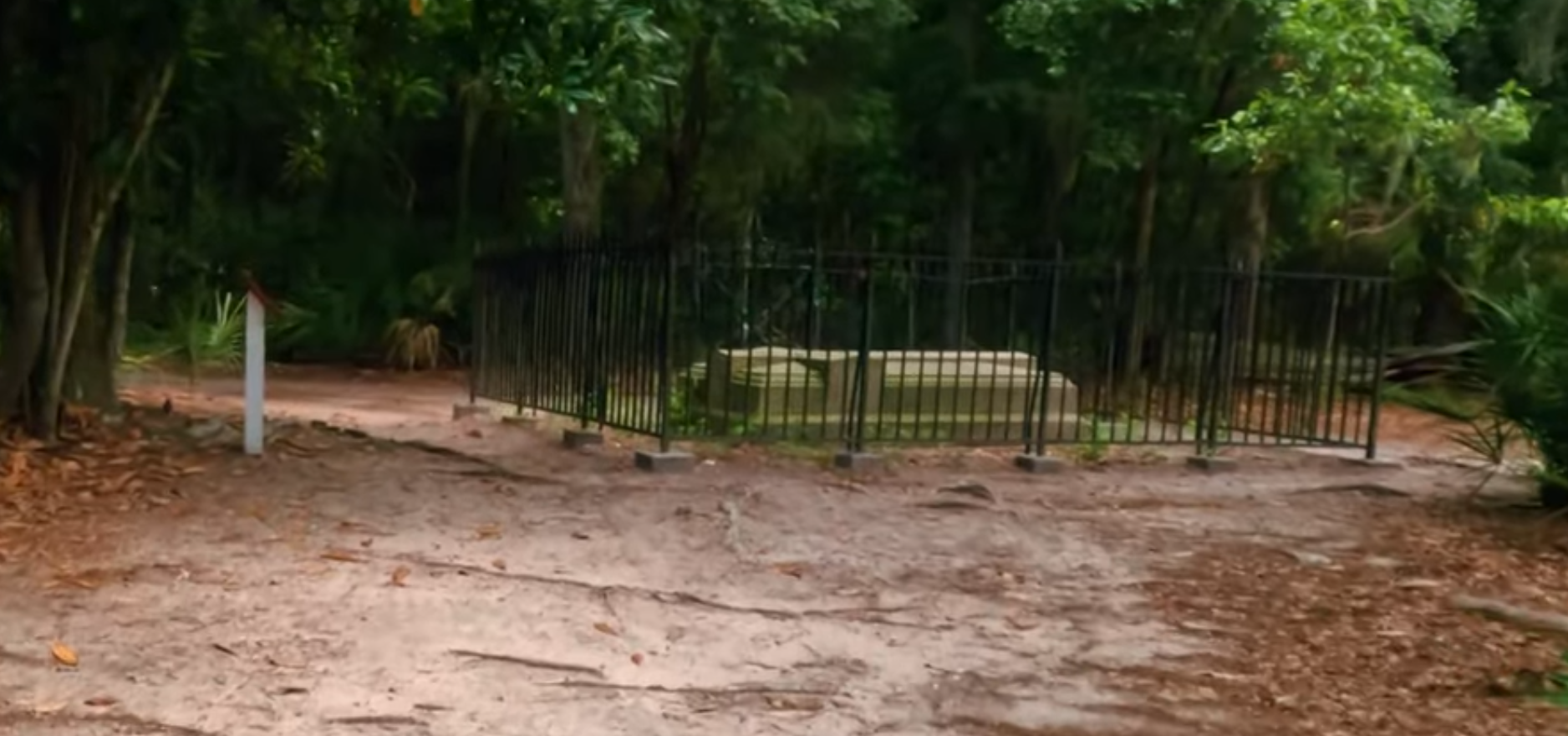
- Interactive map of Wormsloe burial ground

Details
- Established: 1737 (289 years ago)
- Location: Wormsloe Historic Site, Savannah, Georgia
- Country: United States
- Coordinates: 31.959690°N 81.068536°W
- Type: Private
- Find a Grave: Wormsloe burial ground

Wormsloe burial ground (also known as the Jones burial ground) is a historic cemetery at the Wormsloe Historic Site near Savannah, Georgia, United States. Wormsloe's founder, Englishman Noble Jones, was initially buried there upon his death in 1775, but his remains were later removed from the family vault to Colonial Park Cemetery, then to Bonaventure Cemetery. His wife, Sarah, and son, Inigo, remain interred at Wormsloe.

In 1875, five years before his death, Wormsloe's then-owner George Wymberley Jones De Renne erected a tombstone in the grounds of the estate to mark the burial location of his ancestors. The inscription reads: "George Wymberley Jones De Renne hath laid this stone MDCCCLXXV to mark old burial place of Wormsloe, 1737–1789, and to save from oblivion the graves of his kindred."

== Burials ==
Known burials at the location include:

- James Bulloch and his wife, Jean
- Sarah Jones, wife of Noble Jones, and their son, Inigo
- George Wymberley De Renne's daughter, Elfrida De Renne Barrow, and her husband, Craig
- Barrow's son, Craig Jr. and his wife, Laura Palmer Bell
