= Martin J. Crawford =

American judge (1820–1883)

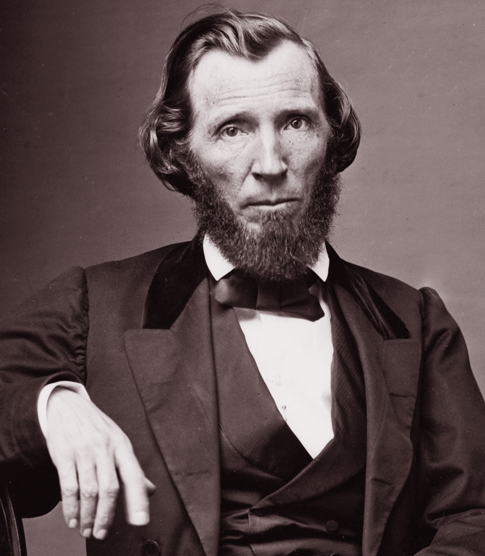

Member of the C.S. Congress from Georgia
- In office February 8, 1861 – February 17, 1862
- Preceded by: Position established
- Succeeded by: Position abolished

Member of the U.S. House of Representatives from Georgia's 2nd district
- In office March 4, 1855 – January 23, 1861
- Preceded by: Alfred Colquitt
- Succeeded by: Nelson Tift

Member of the Georgia House of Representatives
- In office 1845–1847

Personal details
- Born: Martin Jenkins Crawford; March 17, 1820 Jasper County, Georgia
- Died: July 23, 1883 (aged 63) Columbus, Georgia
- Resting place: Linwood Cemetery in Columbus, Georgia
- Party: Democratic

Military service
- Allegiance: Confederate States
- Branch/service: Confederate States Army
- Years of service: 1862–1865
- Rank: Colonel
- Battles/wars: American Civil War

Martin Jenkins Crawford (March 17, 1820 – July 23, 1883) was an antebellum U.S. Representative and a representative to the Provisional Confederate Congress during the American Civil War from the state of Georgia.

== Life and career ==
Martin J. Crawford was born March 17, 1820, in Jasper County, Georgia. He attended Brownwood Institute and Mercer University in Macon, Georgia. After studying law, he was admitted to the State Bar of Georgia in 1839. Crawford started his practice in Hamilton, Georgia—where Crawford was also involved with farming.

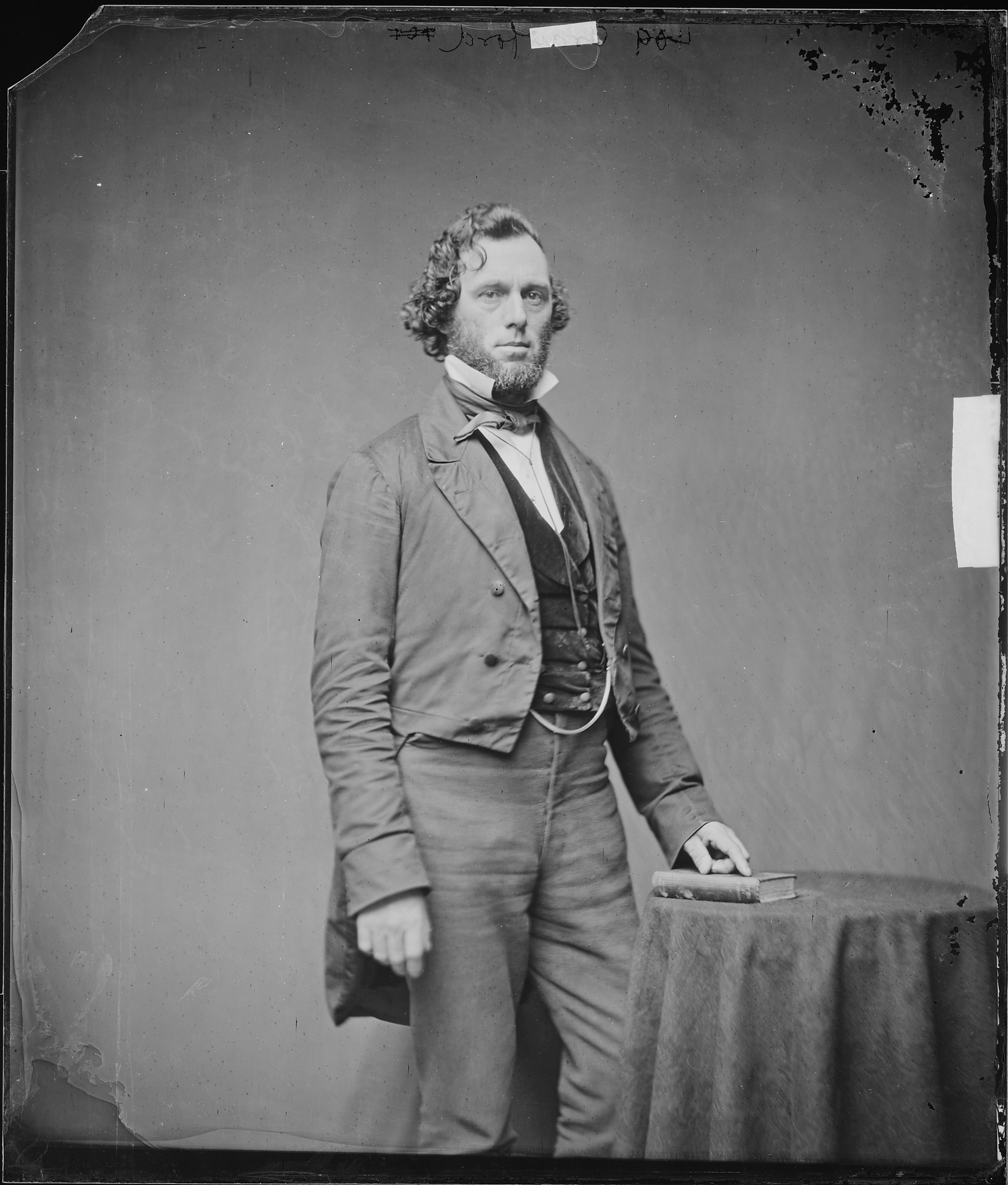
Rep. Martin Jenkins Crawford

From 1845 to 1847, Crawford served in the Georgia House of Representatives. After moving to Columbus, Georgia, in 1849, he served as a delegate to the Southern convention at Nashville in May 1850. From February 1, 1854, to November 1854, Crawford was a judge of the superior courts of the Chattahoochee circuit.

=== Congress ===
In 1854, Crawford was elected as a Democrat to the 34th United States Congress to represent Georgia's 2nd congressional district. He was reelected to two additional terms in the seat (35th and 36th Congresses), and his congressional service spanned from March 4, 1855, until his resignation on January 23, 1861, with Georgia having seceded the Union on January 22.

=== Confederate Congress ===
After resigning the U.S. Congress, Crawford was elected to the Confederate Provisional Congress, serving from January 1861 to February 22, 1862. Confederate President Jefferson Davis appointed Crawford as a special commissioner to the United States in Washington, D.C.

=== Civil War ===
Crawford organized the 3rd Regiment, Georgia Cavalry in May 1862 to support the Confederate States Army, operating with the Army of Tennessee. Under Crawford's command the 3rd Regiment saw combat, fighting in Kentucky with General Wheeler. The next campaign at New Haven saw most of the regiment taken prisoner—the retreating contingent fought at the Battle of Murfreesboro—then reconstituted under Colonel J.J. Morrison. The Georgia 3rd surrendered on April 26, 1865, with the Army of Tennessee—surrendering field officers were Colonels Martin J. Crawford, Richard E. Kennon, and Robert Thompson; Lieutenant Colonel James T. Thornton; and Majors Daniel F. Booton and Hiram H. Johnson.

=== Later career and death ===
After the war, Crawford became judge of the superior court of the Chattahoochee circuit on October 1, 1875, to fill a vacancy. He was reappointed in 1877 and served on that bench until he resigned on February 9, 1880. The next day, he was appointed to a vacant position on the Supreme Court of Georgia and served on that court until his death in Columbus. He was buried in that city's Linwood Cemetery.

== See also ==
- List of signers of the Georgia Ordinance of Secession
- Confederate States of America, causes of secession, "Died of states' rights"

U.S. House of Representatives
| Preceded by Alfred Colquitt | Member of the U.S. House of Representatives from Georgia's 2nd congressional district March 4, 1855 – January 23, 1861 | Succeeded by vacant |
Political offices
| Preceded by Position established | Deputy in the C.S. Congress from Georgia; February 8, 1861 – February 17, 1862 | Succeeded by Position abolished |
