= 1860 United States presidential election in Georgia =

- November 6, 1860
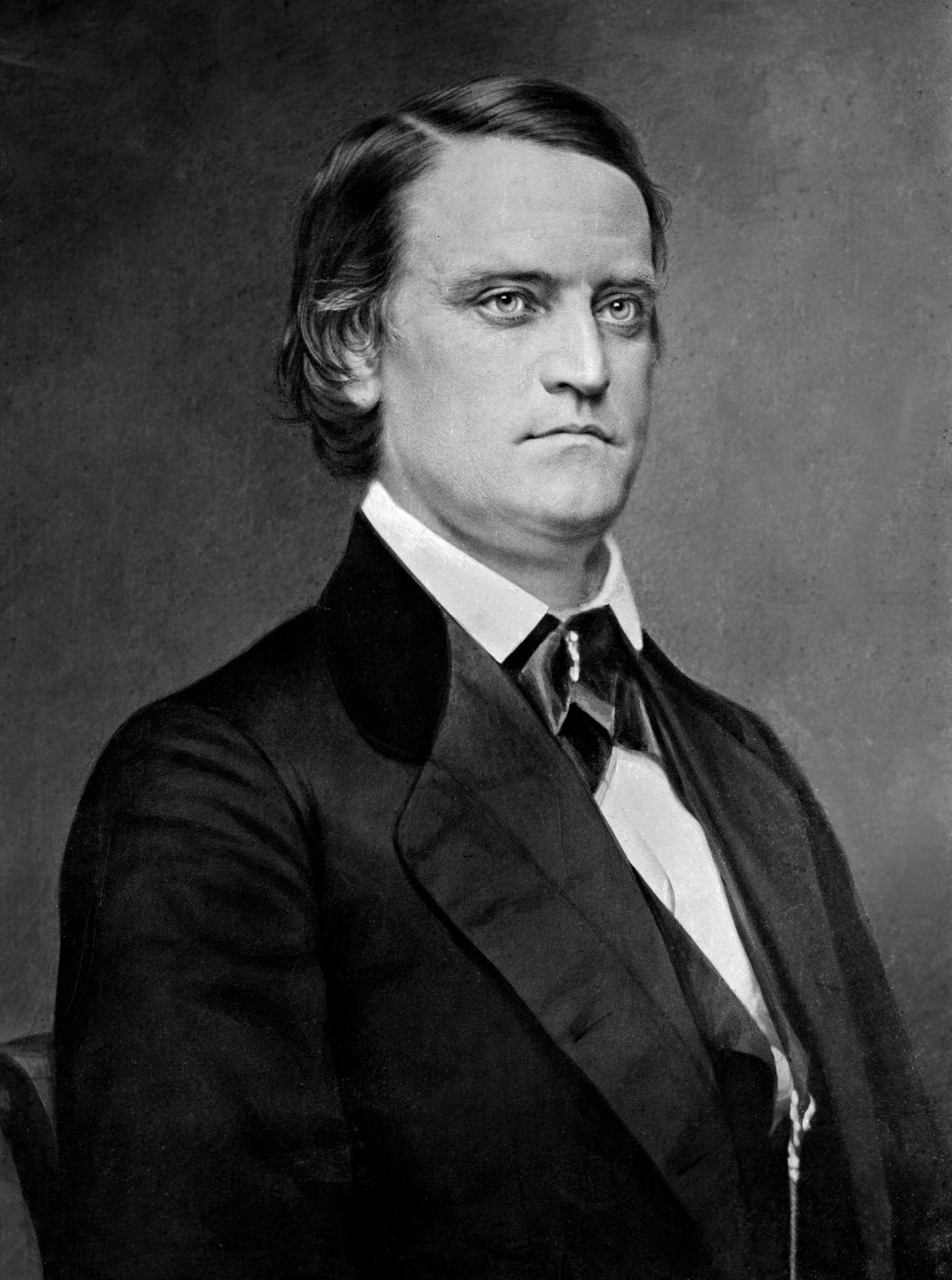

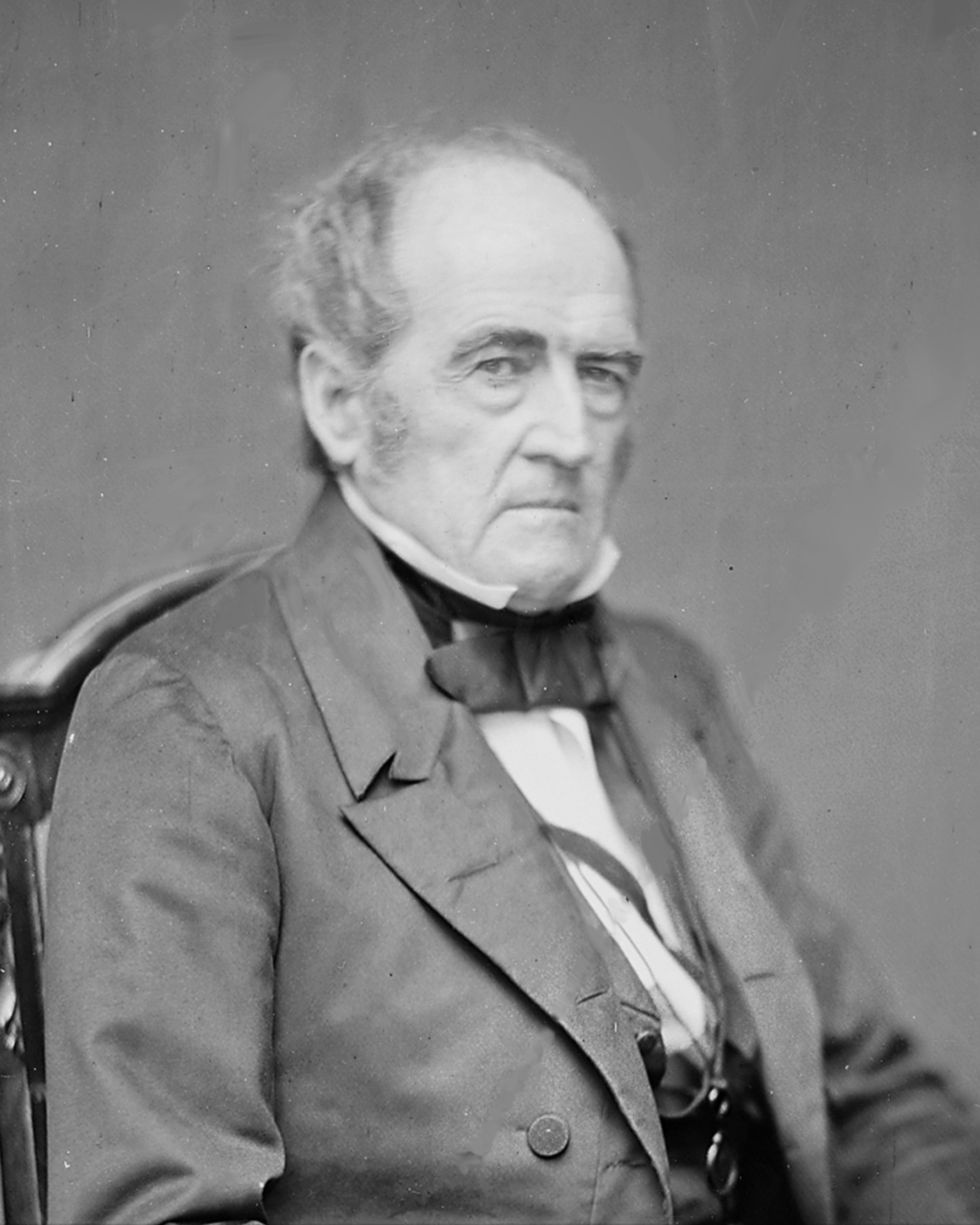

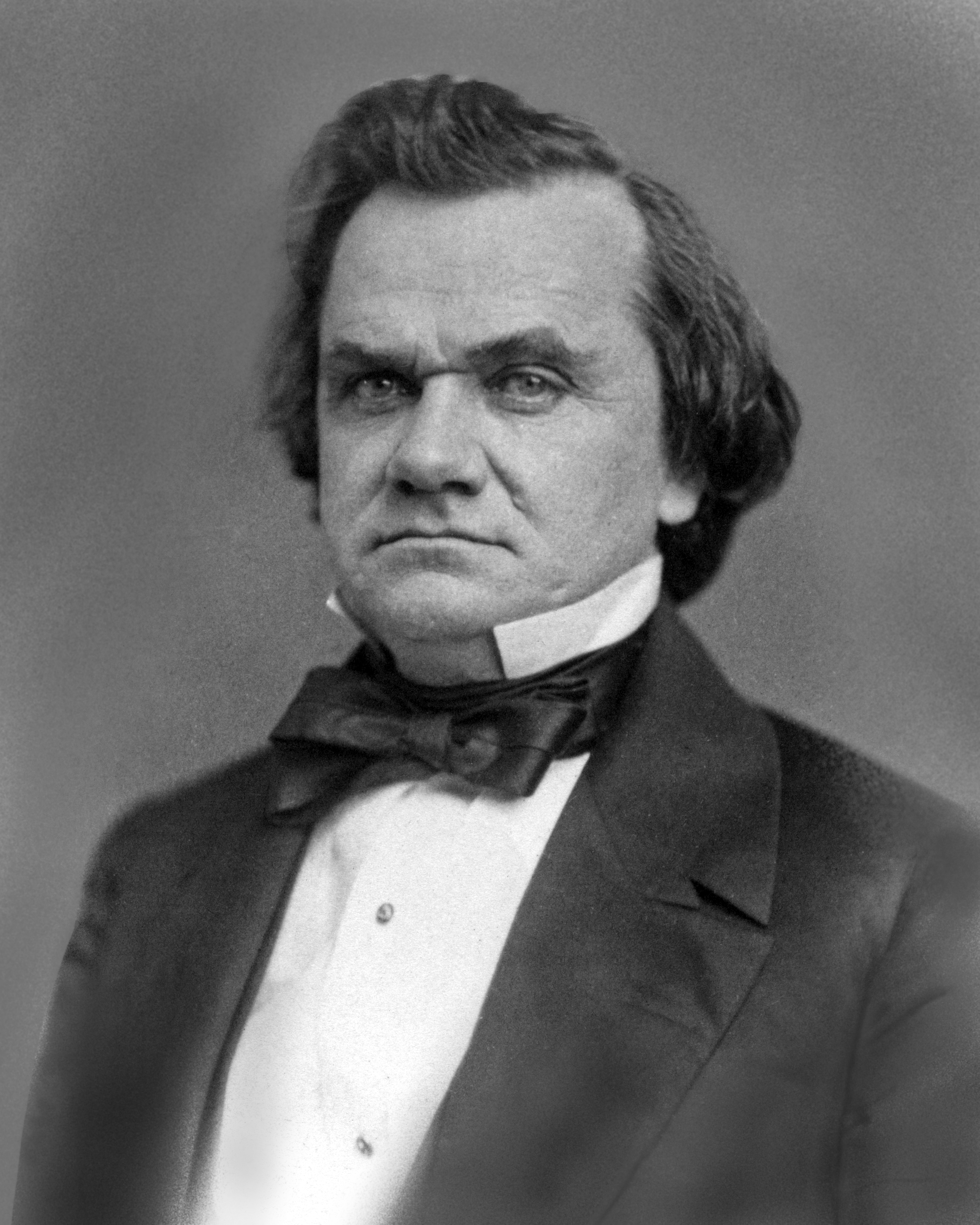
Nominee	John C. Breckinridge	John Bell	Stephen A. Douglas
Party	Southern Democratic	Constitutional Union	Democratic
Home state	Kentucky	Tennessee	Illinois
Running mate	Joseph Lane	Edward Everett	Herschel V. Johnson
Electoral vote	10	0	0
Popular vote	52,181 (Note: According to the added official county returns. Stated total was 52,210)	42,954 (Note: Stated total was 43,083)	11,687
Percentage	48.85%	40.21%	10.94%
Legislature vote	173 (70.61%)	54 (22.04%)	18 (7.35%)
County results
Breckinridge
40–50%
50–60%
60–70%
70–80%
80–90%
90–100%
Bell
40–50%
50–60%
60–70%
70–80%
80–90%
Douglas
40–50%
50–60%
60–70%
Tie
40–50%
President before election
James Buchanan
Democratic
Elected President
Abraham Lincoln
Republican

The 1860 United States presidential election in Georgia took place on November 6, 1860, as part of the 1860 United States presidential election. Georgia voters chose 10 representatives, or electors, to the Electoral College, who voted for president and vice president.

In the election, Southern Democratic candidate 14th Vice President of the United States John C. Breckinridge and his running mate Senator Joseph Lane won the plurality of the vote against Constitutional Union candidate Senator John Bell and his running mate Governor of Massachusetts Edward Everett as well as Democratic candidate Senator Stephen A. Douglas and his running mate 41st Governor of Georgia Herschel V. Johnson. The Republican Party and its candidate Abraham Lincoln did not have significant ballot distribution in the state.

As no candidate received a majority of the popular vote, the election was thrown into the General Assembly, which voted to select 10 Breckinridge electors.

== Results ==
=== Legislature vote by elector ===
1860 United States presidential election in Georgia
Party	Candidate elector	Votes
SD	Peter Cone Cone	173
SD	Hardy Strickland	173
SD	W. M. Slaughter	172
SD	O. C. Gibson	172
SD	Hugh Buchanan	172
SD	W. A. Lofton	172
SD	W. M. McIntosh	172
SD	Henry R. Jackson	171
SD	Lewis Tumlin	171
SD	Alfred H. Colquitt	162
CU	Benjamin Harvey Hill	54
CU	Wm. F. Wright	54
CU	J. R. Parrott	54
CU	I. E. Dupree	54
CU	Charles Augustus Lafayette Lamar	54
CU	William Law	53
CU	S. Spencer	52
CU	L. T. Doyal	52
CU	Hiram Parks Bell	52
CU	M. Douglass	47
D	Alexander H. Stephens	18
D	Ambrose R. Wright	8
D	James Lindsay Seward	8
D	B. Y. Martin	8
D	Nathan Bass	8
D	Hiram B. Warner	8
D	J. W. Harris	8
D	J. P. Simmons	8
D	J. S. Hook	8
D	Julien Cumming	8

=== Popular vote ===
1860 United States presidential election in Georgia
Party	Candidate	Votes	%
Southern Democratic	John C. Breckinridge	52,181	48.85%
Constitutional Union	John Bell	42,954	40.21%
Democratic	Stephen A. Douglas	11,687	10.94%
Total votes		106,822	100%

=== Results by county ===
1860 United States Presidential Election in Georgia (By County)
County	John Breckinridge Southern Democratic		John Bell Constitutional Union		Stephen Douglas Democratic		Total
County	#	%	#	%	#	%	Total
Appling	287	71.75%	112	28.00%	1	0.25%	400
Baker	259	69.44%	112	30.03%	2	0.54%	373
Baldwin	440	47.21%	397	42.60%	95	10.19%	932
Banks	466	81.75%	94	16.49%	10	1.75%	570
Berrien	316	58.96%	219	40.86%	1	0.19%	536
Bibb	812	39.28%	876	42.38%	379	18.34%	2,067
Brooks	336	54.11%	281	45.25%	4	0.64%	621
Bryan	193	71.75%	75	27.88%	1	0.37%	269
Bulloch	567	98.61%	7	1.22%	1	0.17%	575
Burke	468	50.16%	211	22.62%	254	27.22%	933
Butts	309	51.07%	269	44.46%	27	4.46%	605
Calhoun	230	68.86%	98	29.34%	6	1.80%	334
Camden	207	85.54%	35	14.46%	0	0.00%	242
Campbell	785	64.82%	412	34.02%	14	1.16%	1,211
Carroll	1,294	70.67%	508	27.74%	29	1.58%	1,831
Cass	1,055	50.67%	699	33.57%	328	15.75%	2,082
Catoosa	382	48.11%	338	42.57%	74	9.32%	794
Charlton	141	75.81%	43	23.12%	2	1.08%	186
Chatham	1,812	67.11%	568	21.04%	320	11.85%	2,700
Chattahoochee	303	55.29%	226	41.24%	19	3.47%	548
Chattooga	287	32.80%	436	49.83%	152	17.37%	875
Cherokee	851	59.06%	446	30.95%	144	9.99%	1,441
Clarke	452	37.54%	695	57.72%	57	4.73%	1,204
Clay	286	52.57%	246	45.22%	12	2.21%	544
Clayton	197	32.24%	311	50.90%	103	16.86%	611
Clinch	115	50.66%	106	46.70%	6	2.64%	227
Cobb	1,368	67.16%	623	30.58%	46	2.26%	2,037
Coffee	93	67.88%	30	21.90%	14	10.22%	137
Colquitt	115	62.84%	67	36.61%	1	0.55%	183
Columbia	67	8.75%	336	43.86%	363	47.39%	766
Coweta	896	60.34%	534	35.96%	55	3.70%	1,485
Crawford	378	66.55%	188	33.10%	2	0.35%	568
Dade	259	56.43%	177	38.56%	23	5.01%	459
Dawson	338	68.70%	92	18.70%	62	12.60%	492
Decatur	579	52.68%	519	47.22%	1	0.09%	1,099
DeKalb	636	57.04%	415	37.22%	64	5.74%	1,115
Dooly	348	55.33%	253	40.22%	28	4.45%	629
Dougherty	372	55.11%	277	41.04%	26	3.85%	675
Early	294	70.50%	122	29.26%	1	0.24%	417
Echols	87	77.68%	25	22.32%	0	0.00%	112
Effingham	209	50.00%	206	49.28%	3	0.72%	418
Elbert	120	13.82%	291	33.53%	457	52.65%	868
Emanuel	210	42.51%	242	48.99%	42	8.50%	494
Fannin	545	69.43%	148	18.85%	92	11.72%	785
Fayette	466	58.47%	302	37.89%	29	3.64%	797
Floyd	756	39.96%	849	44.87%	287	15.17%	1,892
Forsyth	630	60.52%	364	34.97%	47	4.51%	1,041
Franklin	726	83.83%	137	15.82%	3	0.35%	866
Fulton	1,018	39.77%	1,195	46.68%	347	13.55%	2,560
Gilmer	755	82.97%	122	13.41%	33	3.63%	910
Glascock	58	23.58%	15	6.10%	173	70.33%	246
Glynn	177	90.77%	17	8.72%	1	0.51%	195
Gordon	874	60.03%	490	33.65%	92	6.32%	1,456
Greene	114	13.48%	581	68.68%	151	17.85%	846
Gwinnett	643	38.92%	775	46.91%	234	14.16%	1,652
Habersham	457	63.74%	188	26.22%	72	10.04%	717
Hall	467	44.48%	500	47.62%	83	7.90%	1,050
Hancock	128	18.88%	402	59.29%	148	21.83%	678
Haralson	356	84.96%	62	14.80%	1	0.24%	419
Harris	392	35.28%	689	62.02%	30	2.70%	1,111
Hart	482	66.67%	151	20.89%	90	12.45%	723
Heard	439	49.83%	380	43.13%	62	7.04%	881
Henry	523	42.35%	658	53.28%	54	4.37%	1,235
Houston	555	48.05%	569	49.26%	31	2.68%	1,155
Irwin	74	77.89%	19	20.00%	2	2.11%	95
Jackson	675	54.17%	463	37.16%	108	8.67%	1,246
Jasper	251	31.65%	369	46.53%	173	21.82%	793
Jefferson	67	8.86%	363	48.02%	326	43.12%	756
Johnson	117	29.62%	182	46.08%	96	24.30%	395
Jones	235	50.76%	214	46.22%	14	3.02%	463
Laurens	128	21.62%	428	72.30%	36	6.08%	592
Lee	240	50.10%	222	46.35%	17	3.55%	479
Liberty	264	61.40%	145	33.72%	21	4.88%	430
Lincoln	34	10.83%	167	53.18%	113	35.99%	314
Lowndes	313	57.33%	231	42.31%	2	0.37%	546
Lumpkin	393	52.96%	319	42.99%	30	4.04%	742
Macon	271	38.49%	419	59.52%	14	1.99%	704
Madison	375	60.58%	233	37.64%	11	1.78%	619
Marion	321	47.00%	321	47.00%	41	6.00%	683
McIntosh	200	82.99%	41	17.01%	0	0.00%	241
Meriwether	615	50.37%	557	45.62%	49	4.01%	1,221
Miller	231	89.19%	28	10.81%	0	0.00%	259
Milton	417	53.32%	340	43.48%	25	3.20%	782
Mitchell	327	65.53%	144	28.86%	28	5.61%	499
Monroe	464	40.03%	638	55.05%	57	4.92%	1,159
Montgomery	40	13.29%	255	84.72%	6	1.99%	301
Morgan	102	16.86%	361	59.67%	142	23.47%	605
Murray	421	47.73%	251	28.46%	210	23.81%	882
Muscogee	769	45.34%	767	45.22%	160	9.43%	1,696
Newton	364	23.87%	810	53.11%	351	23.02%	1,525
Oglethorpe	263	32.19%	367	44.92%	187	22.89%	817
Paulding	781	76.72%	198	19.45%	39	3.83%	1,018
Pickens	452	69.86%	150	23.18%	45	6.96%	647
Pierce	237	74.76%	79	24.92%	1	0.32%	317
Pike	596	57.42%	427	41.14%	15	1.45%	1,038
Polk	326	45.34%	345	47.98%	48	6.68%	719
Pulaski	464	59.18%	286	36.48%	34	4.34%	784
Putnam	176	28.21%	291	46.63%	157	25.16%	624
Quitman	237	58.23%	167	41.03%	3	0.74%	407
Rabun	353	91.93%	21	5.47%	10	2.60%	384
Randolph	587	51.58%	494	43.41%	57	5.01%	1,138
Richmond	403	17.49%	849	36.85%	1,052	45.66%	2,304
Schley	142	32.13%	235	53.17%	65	14.71%	442
Screven	343	62.59%	171	31.20%	34	6.20%	548
Spalding	596	51.69%	530	45.97%	27	2.34%	1,153
Stewart	538	51.73%	484	46.54%	18	1.73%	1,040
Sumter	380	31.54%	694	57.59%	131	10.87%	1,205
Talbot	406	40.76%	504	50.60%	86	8.63%	996
Taliaferro	9	2.24%	173	43.03%	220	54.73%	402
Tattnall	313	60.31%	202	38.92%	4	0.77%	519
Taylor	394	50.71%	361	46.46%	22	2.83%	777
Telfair	98	42.42%	127	54.98%	6	2.60%	231
Terrell	227	33.24%	387	56.66%	69	10.10%	683
Thomas	402	42.99%	499	53.37%	34	3.64%	935
Towns	192	49.61%	101	26.10%	94	24.29%	387
Troup	462	31.22%	970	65.54%	48	3.24%	1,480
Twiggs	320	63.12%	181	35.70%	6	1.18%	507
Union	474	67.62%	216	30.81%	11	1.57%	701
Upson	279	29.46%	619	65.36%	49	5.17%	947
Walker	487	33.49%	649	44.64%	318	21.87%	1,454
Walton	555	42.30%	574	43.75%	183	13.95%	1,312
Ware	212	85.83%	34	13.77%	1	0.40%	247
Warren	55	7.62%	240	33.24%	427	59.14%	722
Washington	313	26.02%	608	50.54%	282	23.44%	1,203
Wayne	134	78.36%	37	21.64%	0	0.00%	171
Webster	244	45.19%	293	54.26%	3	0.56%	540
White	220	55.00%	151	37.75%	29	7.25%	400
Whitfield	747	53.40%	450	32.17%	202	14.44%	1,399
Wilcox	254	92.03%	19	6.88%	3	1.09%	276
Wilkes	266	35.99%	302	40.87%	171	23.14%	739
Wilkinson	484	50.47%	364	37.96%	111	11.57%	959
Worth	263	67.61%	122	31.36%	4	1.03%	389
Total	52,172	48.82%	43,069	40.30%	11,627	10.88%	106,868

== See also ==
- United States presidential elections in Georgia
