= Alfred H. Colquitt =

American politician

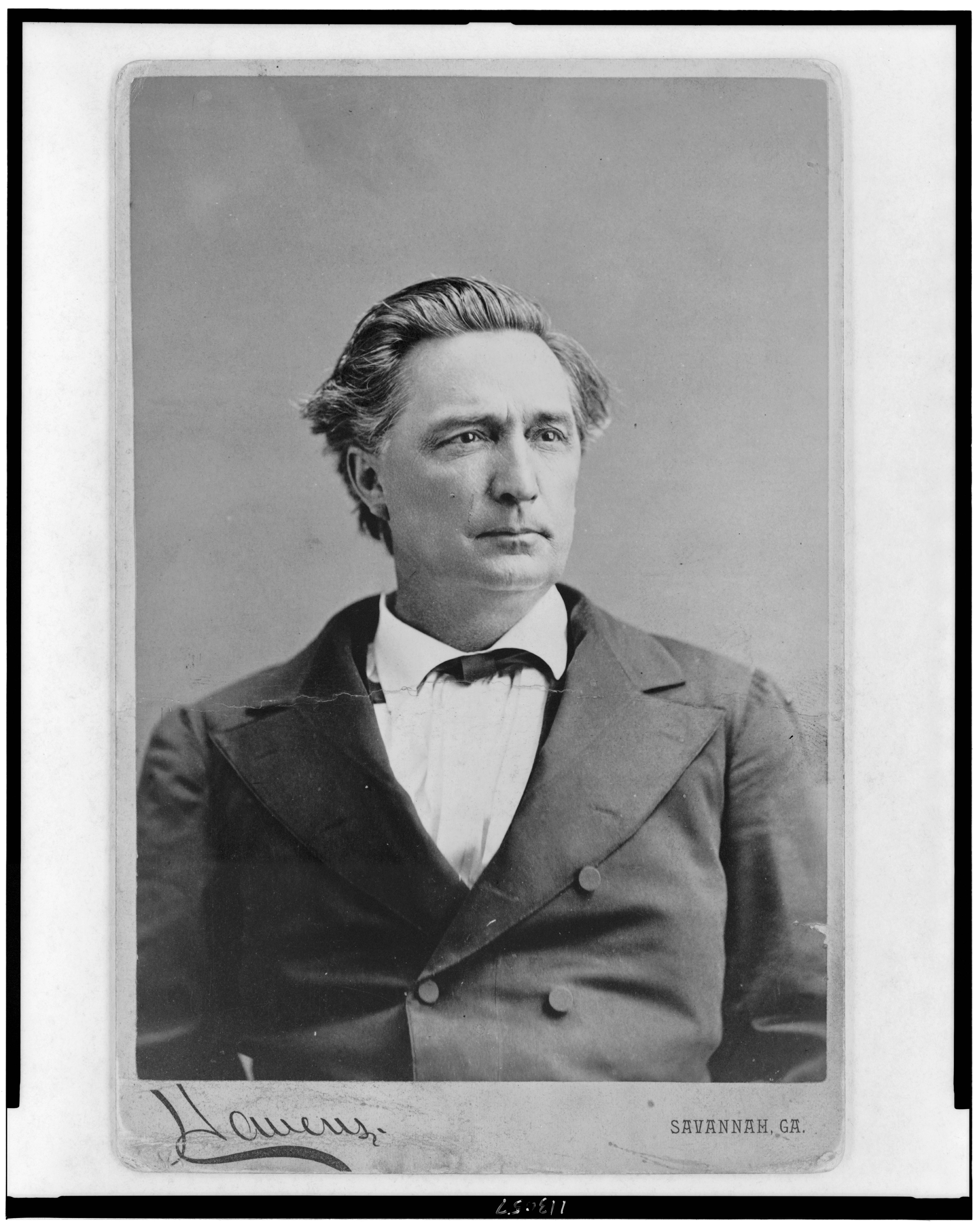
- Colquitt in 1866

United States Senator from Georgia
- In office March 4, 1883 – March 26, 1894
- Preceded by: Middleton P. Barrow
- Succeeded by: Patrick Walsh

49th Governor of Georgia
- In office January 12, 1877 – November 4, 1882
- Preceded by: James M. Smith
- Succeeded by: Alexander H. Stephens

Member of the U.S. House of Representatives from Georgia's 2nd district
- In office March 4, 1853 – March 3, 1855
- Preceded by: James Johnson
- Succeeded by: Martin J. Crawford

Member of the Georgia State Legislature

Personal details
- Born: Alfred Holt Colquitt; April 20, 1824 Monroe, Georgia, U.S.
- Died: March 26, 1894 (aged 69) Washington, D.C., U.S.
- Resting place: Rose Hill Cemetery, Macon, Georgia
- Party: Democratic
- Nickname: "Hero of Olustee"

Military service
- Allegiance: United States of America; Confederate States of America
- Branch/service: United States Army; Confederate States Army
- Years of service: 1846–1848; 1861–1865
- Rank: Major (USA); Brigadier General (CSA)
- Commands: 6th Georgia Infantry Regiment; Colquitt's Brigade
- Battles/wars: Mexican–American War; American Civil War

Alfred Holt Colquitt (April 20, 1824 – March 26, 1894) was an American lawyer, preacher, soldier, and politician. Elected as the 49th governor of Georgia (1877–1882), he was one of numerous Democrats elected to office as white conservatives took back power in the state at the end of the Reconstruction era. He was elected by the Georgia state legislature to two terms as U.S. Senator, serving from 1883 to 1894 and dying in office. He had served as a United States officer in the Mexican-American War and in the Confederate States Army during the American Civil War, reaching the rank of major general.

== Early life ==
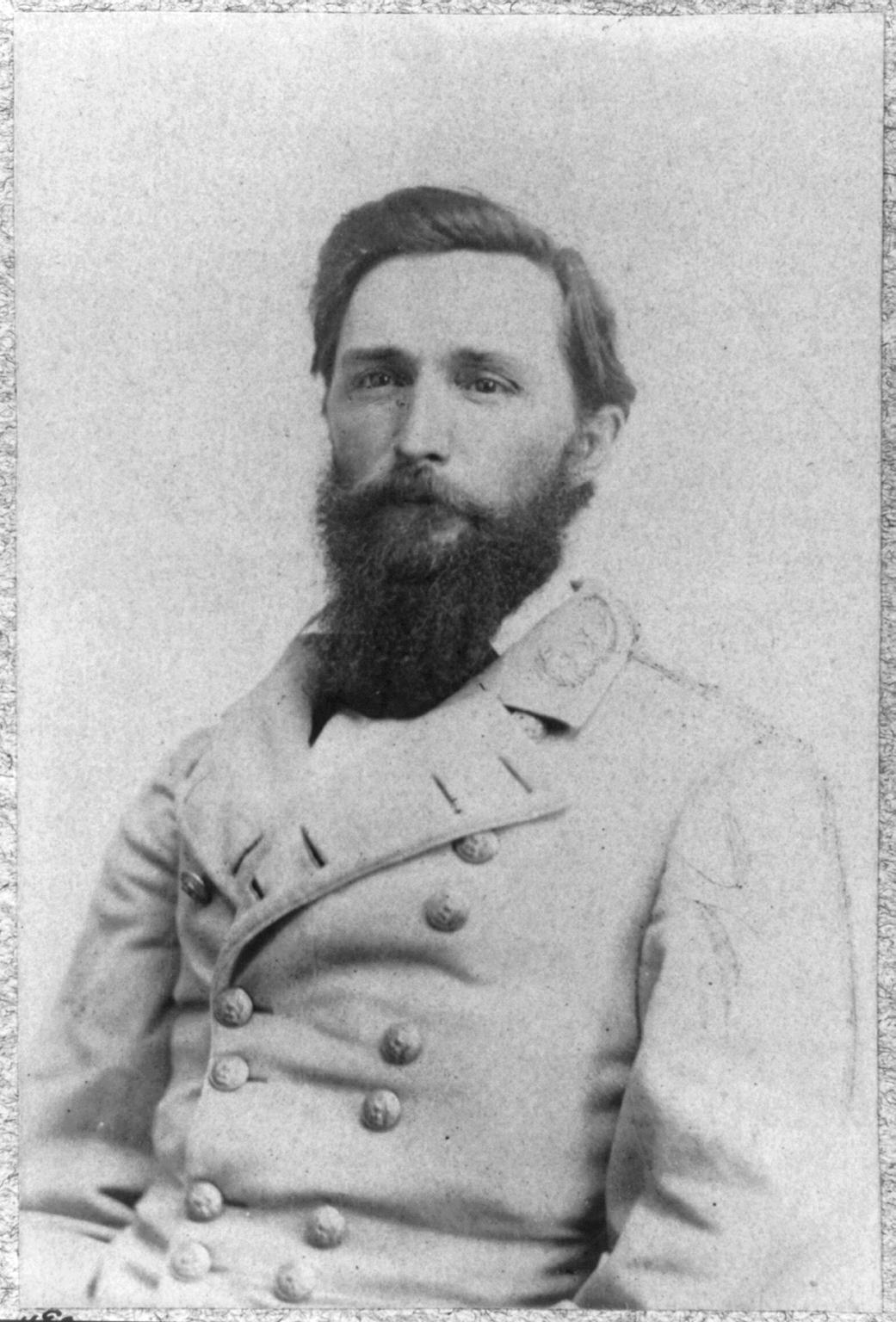
Colquitt as Confederate Brigadier General during the Civil War

Alfred Colquitt was born in Monroe, Georgia. His father, Walter T. Colquitt, became a United States Representative and Senator from Georgia. The younger Colquitt graduated from Princeton College in 1844, studied law and passed his bar examination in 1846. He began practicing law in Monroe.

During the Mexican–American War (1848-1849), Colquitt served as a paymaster in the United States Army at the rank of major. After the war, Colquitt was elected as a member of the United States House of Representatives, serving one term from 1853 to 1855. He next was elected to and served in the Georgia state legislature. Colquitt was a delegate to The Georgia Secession Convention of 1861: he voted in favor of secession and signed Georgia's Ordinance of Secession on January 19, 1861.

Colquitt was a presidential elector in 1860.

== Civil War ==
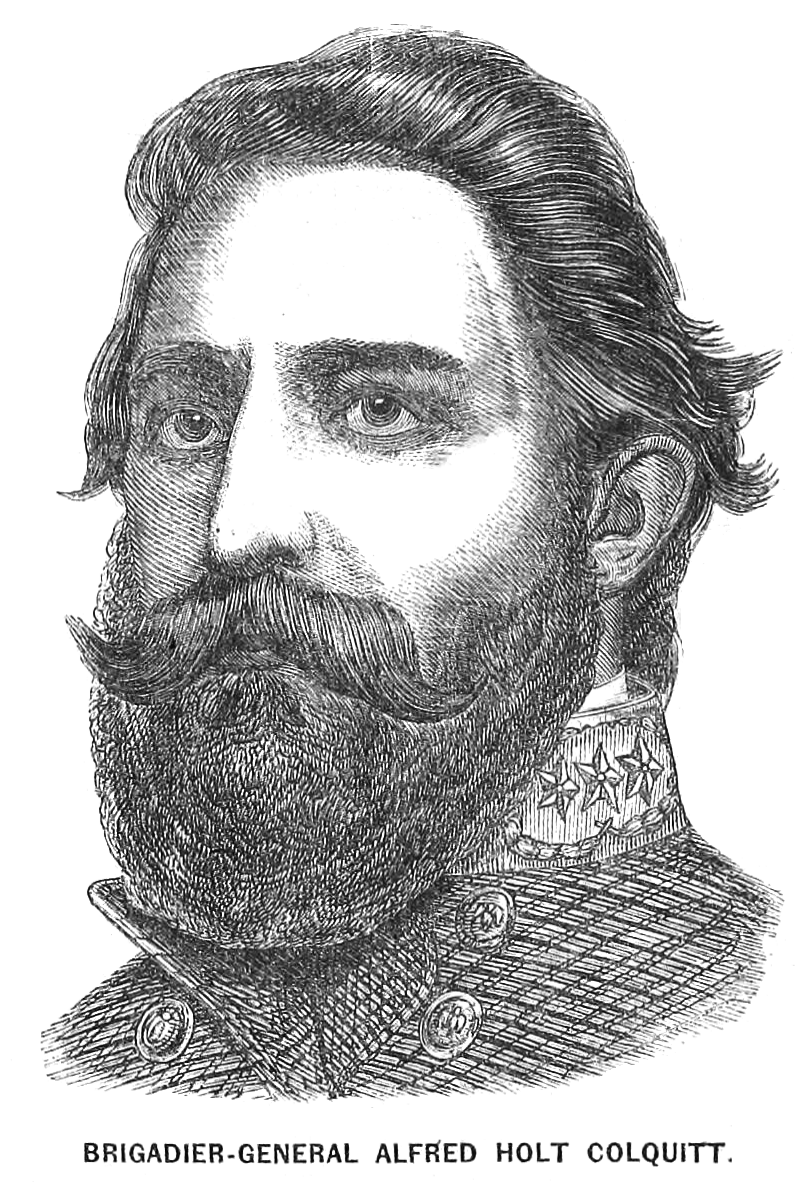
Portrait of Colquitt from a Richmond newspaper in 1863

At the beginning of the civil war, Colquitt was appointed captain in the 6th Georgia Infantry. Eventually rising to colonel, he led his regiment in the Peninsula Campaign. At Seven Pines, he assumed brigade command after Brig. Gen Gabriel Rains was wounded, and led it through the Seven Days Battles. He led his brigade under Stonewall Jackson in the Battle of South Mountain, Battle of Antietam, the Battle of Fredericksburg, and the Battle of Chancellorsville. Colquitt survived Antietam unscathed although nearly every other officer in the brigade was killed or wounded. After the battle, he was immediately promoted to brigadier general, to rank from September 1. By the end of the war, he had been promoted to major general.

After Chancellorsville, some questions arose about Colquitt's performance during that battle, and he was transferred to North Carolina in exchange for Brig. Gen Junius Daniel's brigade. His brigade was transferred again in the summer of 1863 to protect Charleston, South Carolina. In February 1864, Colquitt marched his brigade south to help defend against the Union invasion of Florida, and was victorious in the Battle of Olustee. After this battle, Colquitt's brigade rejoined Robert E. Lee's Army of Northern Virginia. Late in the war the brigade returned to defend North Carolina, where Colquitt surrendered in 1865.

== Political life ==
After returning to political life and near the end of the Reconstruction era, Colquitt defeated Republican candidate Jonathan Norcross for governor of Georgia in 1876. He was one of a number of Democrats elected to office as white conservatives regained power in the state, in part by an overt effort by paramilitary insurgents to disrupt and suppress Republican voting, especially by freedmen. Around that time, several thousand "friends" asked for about 30 open government patronage jobs. Those who did not get one of the jobs tried to turn voters against Colquitt. There were rumors that Colquitt was involved in illegal dealings with the Northeastern Railroad. A legislative committee found the governor innocent. During this time he was a part of the Bourbon Triumvirate.

Colquitt was reelected in 1880 to serve two years under the new state constitution, which reduced the term of governor from four years to two. Under his term, debt was reduced.

In 1883, Colquitt was elected by the state legislature as a Democrat to the US Senate from Georgia (this was the practice before an amendment for popular election of senators was ratified in the 20th century). He was re-elected to a second term in 1888.

In 1892, Colquitt suffered a stroke and became partially paralyzed. He recovered enough to resume his duties as a senator, but in March 1894, he suffered another stroke that left him mostly incapacitated. He died two weeks later. His body was returned to Georgia, where he was buried in Rose Hill cemetery in Macon.

== Family life ==
Colquitt's brother, Col. Peyton H. Colquitt, was killed at age 31 at the Battle of Chickamauga.

Colquitt was married twice: first to the former Dorothy Elizabeth Tarver (1829-1855), and after her death to her brother's widow, the former Sarah Bunn Tarver (1832-1898). He was the father of three children with his first wife and seven children with his second wife.

== See also ==
- List of signers of the Georgia Ordinance of Secession
- Confederate States of America, causes of secession, "Died of states' rights"
- List of American Civil War generals (Confederate)
- List of members of the United States Congress who died in office (1790–1899)

Party political offices
Preceded by James Milton Smith	Democratic nominee for Governor of Georgia; 1876, 1880	Succeeded by Alexander H. Stephens
U.S. House of Representatives
Preceded by James Johnson	Member of the U.S. House of Representatives from Georgia's 2nd congressional district March 4, 1853 – March 3, 1855	Succeeded by Martin J. Crawford
Political offices
Preceded by James M. Smith	Governor of Georgia; 1877–1882	Succeeded by Alexander H. Stephens
U.S. Senate
Preceded by Middleton P. Barrow	U.S. senator (Class 2) from Georgia; 1883–1894; Served alongside: Joseph E. Brown, John B. Gordon	Succeeded by Patrick Walsh
