= Walter T. Colquitt =

American politician (1799–1855)

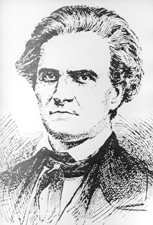

United States Senator from Georgia
- In office March 4, 1843 – February 4, 1848
- Preceded by: Alfred Cuthbert
- Succeeded by: Herschel V. Johnson

Member of the U.S. House of Representatives from Georgia's at-large district
- In office March 4, 1839 – July 21, 1840
- Preceded by: Jabez Y. Jackson
- Succeeded by: Hines Holt
- In office January 3, 1842 – March 3, 1843
- Preceded by: Eugenius A. Nisbet
- Succeeded by: John H. Lumpkin

Member of the Georgia Senate
- In office 1834; 1837

Personal details
- Born: Walter Terry Colquitt; December 27, 1799 Halifax County, Virginia, U.S.
- Died: May 7, 1855 (aged 55) Macon, Georgia, U.S.
- Resting place: Linwood Cemetery; Columbus, Georgia, U.S.
- Party: Democratic
- Spouse: Nancy Holt
- Children: Alfred H. and Peyton H.

Walter Terry Colquitt (December 27, 1799 – May 7, 1855) was a lawyer, circuit-riding Methodist preacher, slave owner, and politician. Born in Virginia, he later moved with his family to Georgia, where he grew up. He graduated from Princeton College, where he read law, and passed the bar.

Later he was elected as United States Representative, and then by the Georgia state legislature as U.S. Senator from the state.

== Life and career ==
Born in 1799 in Monroe, Halifax County, Virginia, Colquitt moved as a child with his parents to Mount Zion in Carroll County, Georgia. He attended Princeton College and studied law, gaining admission to the bar in 1820 at the age of 21.

He began his law practice that year in Sparta, Georgia. Later that year, Colquitt was commissioned as a brigadier general of the state militia, also at the age of 21. Colquitt moved to the village of Cowpens in Walton County, where he practiced law. He was elected judge of the Chattahoochee circuit in 1826, and was re-elected three years later.

He was licensed as a Methodist preacher in 1827, and practiced as a circuit-riding preacher. He became extremely popular in central and south Georgia, mostly for his strong support of states' rights at a time when the state tried to deal directly with the Native American tribes who occupied extensive territory there. The state was trying to force them to cede land for the benefit of white settlers, but only the federal government was authorized constitutionally to make treaties with the Native Americans and deal with them officially.

Colquitt was said to be able to make a stump speech, try a court case and plead another at the bar, christen a child, preach a sermon, and marry a couple - all before dinner. He was elected as a member of the Georgia Senate in 1834 and 1837.

In 1838, after Indian Removal had been underway for several years in Georgia and the Southeast by the federal government, Colquitt was elected as a Whig to the Twenty-sixth Congress, serving from March 4, 1839, to July 21, 1840, when he resigned. He changed parties, affiliating with the Democratic Party. He was elected as a Van Buren Democrat to the Twenty-seventh Congress. Newly available seats were open in the election, due to the resignations of Julius C. Alford, William Crosby Dawson, and Eugenius A. Nisbet.

== Marriages and family ==
Colquitt married Nancy Holt after setting up his law practice. Their children included sons Alfred Holt Colquitt and Peyton H. Colquitt (1831-1863).

Following the death of his first wife, Colquitt married widow Alphea B. (Todd) Fauntleroy in 1841. She died that year, and he married Harriet W. Ross the following year, in 1842.

== National office ==
In 1842 the Georgia state legislature elected Colquitt as a Democrat to the U.S. Senate; he served from March 4, 1843, until his resignation in February 1848. While in the Twenty-ninth Congress, Colquitt was chairman of the Committee on the District of Columbia and the Committee on Patents and Patent Office. He supported the Polk administration in the controversy relative to the Oregon Territory, and was a prominent opponent of the Wilmot Proviso throughout the Mexican–American War.

== Later years ==
Colquitt retired from national politics in 1848 to resume his law practice and preaching. He was a member of the Nashville Convention in 1850, arguing for secession if slavery was restricted in any of the new territories then being added to the country. Colquitt died in 1855 during a trip from Columbus to Macon, Georgia. He was buried in Linwood Cemetery in Columbus, Georgia, where he had been residing.

== Legacy and honors ==
Colquitt County, Georgia is named in memory of Walter T. Colquitt, as was the town of Colquitt, Georgia.

His son, Alfred Holt Colquitt (1824-1894), son of his first wife Nancy (Holt Colquitt, also became a politician, being elected as a U.S. Representative and Senator from Georgia. He served as a general in the Confederate States Army during the American Civil War. His second son, Peyton H. Colquitt (1831-1863), also served as a Confederate officer; the colonel was mortally wounded in the Battle of Chickamauga and died two days later.

U.S. House of Representatives
Preceded by Jabez Y. Jackson	Member of the U.S. House of Representatives from Georgia's at-large congressional district March 4, 1839 – July 21, 1840	Succeeded by Hines Holt
Preceded by Eugenius A. Nisbet	Member of the U.S. House of Representatives from Georgia's at-large congressional district January 3, 1842 – March 3, 1843	Succeeded by John H. Lumpkin
U.S. Senate
Preceded by Alfred Cuthbert	U.S. senator (Class 3) from Georgia; March 4, 1843 – February, 1848; Served alongside: John M. Berrien	Succeeded by Herschel V. Johnson
