= The Oglethorpe Club =

Private gentlemen's club in Savannah, Georgia

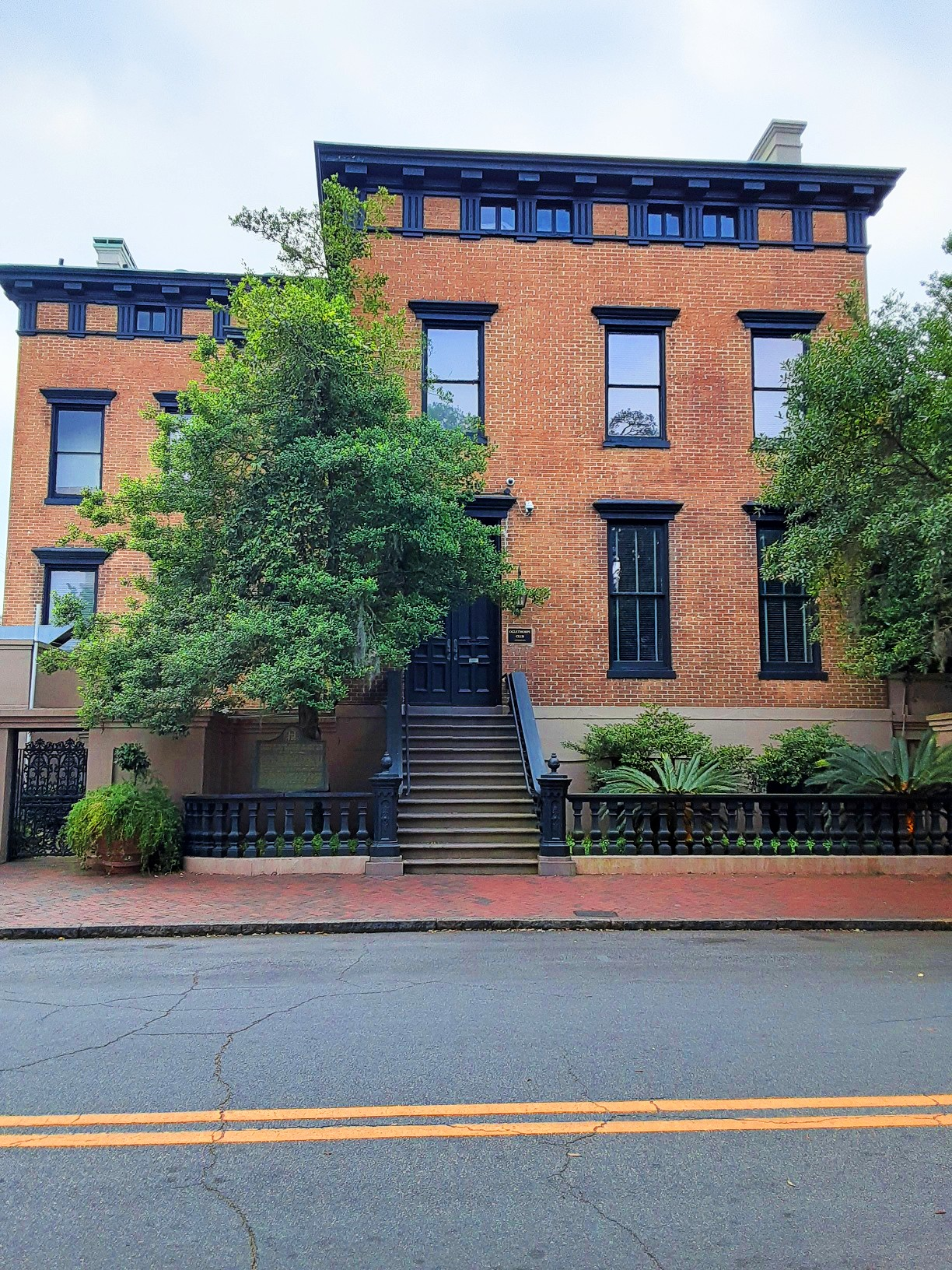
- The club's home, 450 Bull Street, in 2022
- Named after: General James Oglethorpe
- Formation: 1870 (156 years ago)
- Location: Savannah, Georgia
- Website: https://oglethorpeclub.org/

The Oglethorpe Club is a private gentlemen's club in Savannah, Georgia, United States. Established in 1870, it is the oldest such club in Georgia, and the seventh-oldest in the Southern United States, behind Cape Fear Club and ahead of The Athlestan Club. It is located at 450 Bull Street, immediately to the north of Forsyth Park.

Twelve members were present at the formation of the Club on September 18, 1870. Its first president was George S. Owens. Membership was 350 by 2024. Women are not allowed to be members, but spouses and widows are permitted to use the facilities unaccompanied.

The club features the Flagstone and Colonial rooms for formal events, as well as a tavern. Cell phone use inside the building is prohibited.

It stands directly across Bull Street from the Armstrong House, the original owner of which—George Ferguson Armstrong—was a member of The Oglethorpe Club.

The Oglethorpe Club is named for General James Oglethorpe, who established the Savannah colony in 1733.

== Notable members ==
- Jefferson Randolph Anderson, attorney
- George Ferguson Armstrong, businessman
- Wymberley Jones De Renne, preservationist
- Walter Charlton Hartridge Jr., preservationist
- Leonard Mackall, historian
- Sonny Seiler, attorney

== Building ==
450 Bull Street, built in 1857 and also known as the Edmund Molyneux House, was designed by John S. Norris. Edmund Molyneux was consul at Savannah from 1832 to 1862. After the Civil War, the house was purchased by Henry R. Jackson.
