= George Ferguson Armstrong =

- Armstrong pictured around 1910
- Born: September 25, 1868; Guyton, Georgia, U.S.
- Died: 24 January 1924 (aged 55); Savannah, Georgia, U.S.
- Resting place: Bonaventure Cemetery, Savannah, Georgia, U.S.
- Spouse: Lucy Mae Camp (1905–1924; his death)

George Ferguson Armstrong (September 25, 1868 – January 24, 1924) was an American businessman. In 1918, he built Armstrong House (known today as Armstrong Kessler Mansion) in Savannah, Georgia.

== Early life ==
Armstrong was born in 1868 to Benjamin Remington Armstrong and Eliza M. Ferguson, the youngest of their four children. A fifth child, John Remington, was born two years before George but died in infancy.

After studying at Chatham Academy, he completed one year of postgraduate work under Professor H. F. Train.

== Career ==
In 1886, Armstrong began working for Savannah oil merchants Blodgett, Moore & Company.

Armstrong became vice-president of Strachan & Company, a Savannah shipping company, having started with the company as a clerk in 1887. He was also president of the Mutual Mining Company, extractors and shippers of Florida phosphate, and a director of the Hibernia Bank and of the Commercial Life Insurance and Casualty Company.

He is credited with the development of the Port of Savannah. In 1910, he began a three-term stint a Commissioner of Pilotage in Savannah.

== Personal life ==
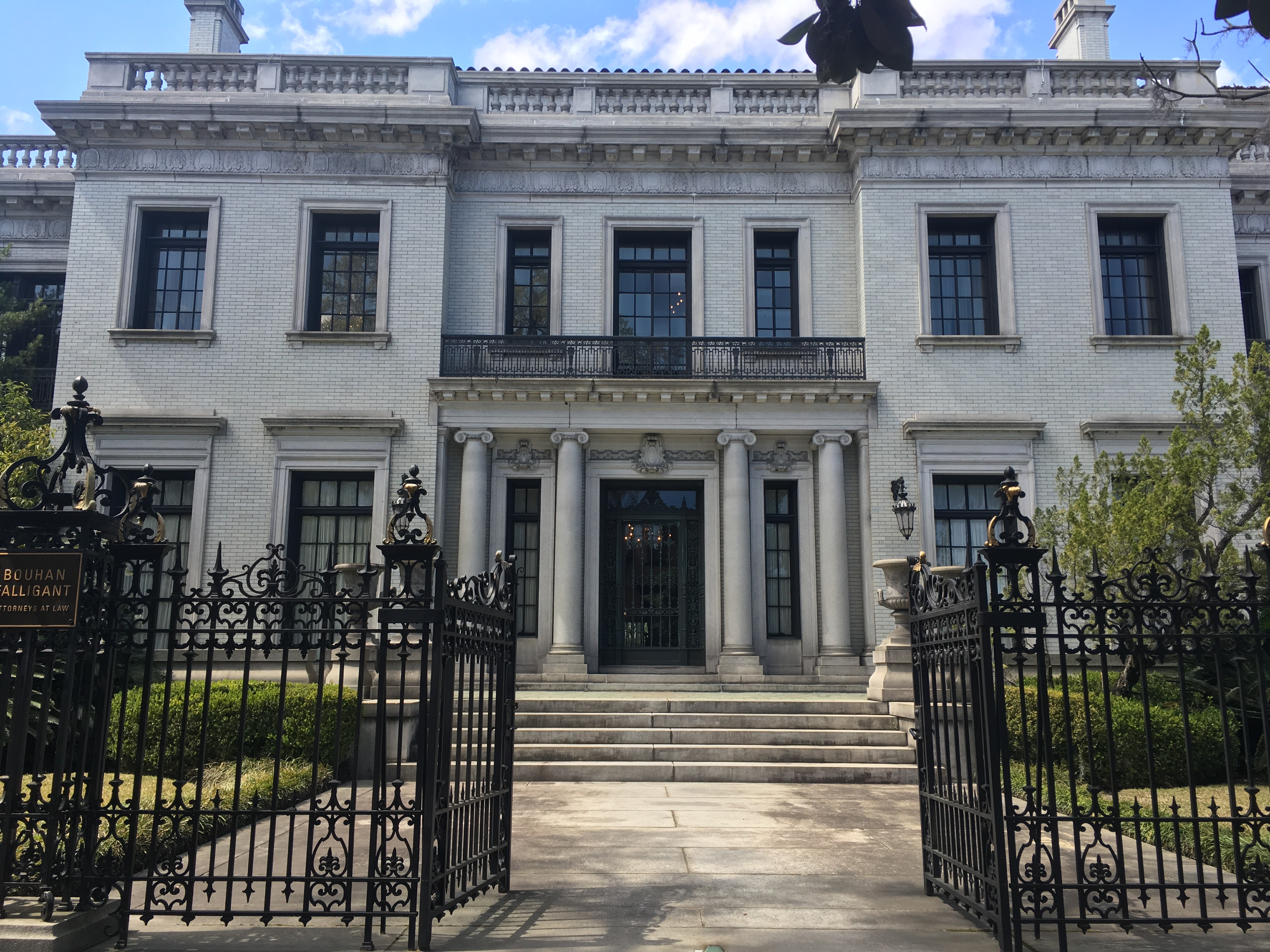
Armstrong House (2017)

In 1888, Armstrong enlisted as a private in the Chatham Artillery, and served in the Spanish–American War. He later became second-lieutenant of his company.

In 1905, he married Lucy Mae Camp, with whom he had one child: daughter Lucy Camp Armstrong.

In 1918, Armstrong had built today's Armstrong House, at the corner of Bull Street and Gaston Street in Savannah, on the northern edge of Forsyth Park. It was designed by noted architect Henrik Wallin.

Armstrong was a member of The Oglethorpe Club, located directly across Bull Street from Armstrong House, and the Savannah Cotton Exchange.

== Death ==
Armstrong died early in the new year of 1924, from lung cancer, aged 55. He was interred in Savannah's Bonaventure Cemetery. Despite her having married Carl Jerome Moltz after Armstrong's death, Lucy Mae was buried beside her first husband upon her death in 1970, at the age of 87.

His widow and daughter donated Armstrong House to Armstrong Junior College at the request of Savannah mayor Thomas Gamble.
