= Sonny Seiler =

American attorney (1933–2023)

Personal details
- Born: Frank Seiler; February 20, 1933 Savannah, Georgia, U.S.
- Died: August 28, 2023 (aged 90)
- Resting place: Bonaventure Cemetery, Savannah, Georgia, U.S.
- Spouse: Cecelia Gunn (m. 1956; died 2014)
- Children: 4
- Profession: Trial attorney

Frank W. "Sonny" Seiler (February 20, 1933 – August 28, 2023) was an American trial attorney from Savannah, Georgia, who had a leading role in the true-crime book Midnight in the Garden of Good and Evil. He was the owner of the University of Georgia Bulldogs live mascots Uga, a series of successively numbered English bulldogs.

== Early life ==
Seiler graduated in 1950 from the Porter Military Academy, now the Porter-Gaud School, in Charleston, South Carolina. He earned his bachelor's and law degrees from the University of Georgia (1956 and 1958), where he was a member of the Sigma Chi fraternity and the Gridiron Secret Society and a founder of the Order of the Greek Horsemen.

== Career ==
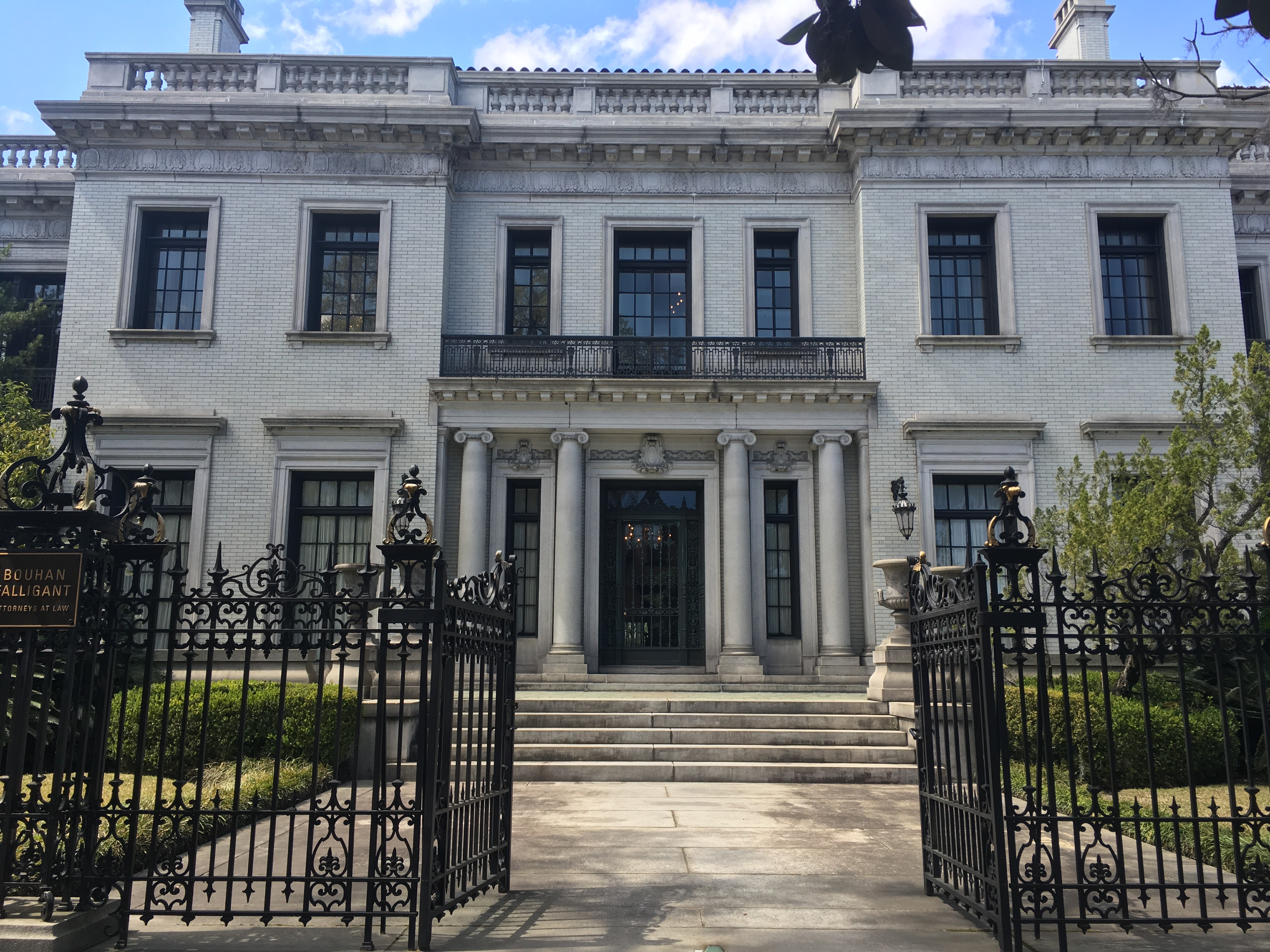
Armstrong House, home of Bouhan Falligant LLP between 1970 and 2017

Seiler practiced law in Savannah, where he was a senior partner at Bouhan Falligant LLP. In 1973 he served as president of the State Bar of Georgia. He was featured in the true-crime book Midnight in the Garden of Good and Evil as the lawyer who defended antiques dealer Jim Williams in a murder case. Because of his and Uga's role in the story, Seiler was cast in the movie adaptation of the book as Judge Samuel L. White, who presided over Williams' trial. Jack Thompson portrayed Seiler in the movie. "I had a deal with (screenwriter) John Lee Hancock that he would get me on the jury. I wanted to be the foreperson who stood up at the end and said, 'We the jury find the defendant not guilty.' That's what I wanted more than anything because that would quietly stick my tongue out at a lot of people." The casting director Phyllis Hoffman convinced him he would be better suited to playing the judge.

He subsequently appeared in two other movies filmed in Savannah, The Legend of Bagger Vance and The Gingerbread Man.

His firm's then-office, Armstrong House, was featured, along with other locations in Savannah, in the original 1962 film Cape Fear, starring Gregory Peck and Robert Mitchum. The company moved to One West Park Avenue in 2017.

Seiler is interviewed in the book Rebels, Saints & Sinners: Savannah's Rich History and Colorful Personalities (Pelican Publishing 2002) by Timothy Daiss, in the chapter titled "Corruption Savannah Style." In this chapter, Seiler reflects on his early years as an attorney around the early 1960s and recounts the life of Savannah political boss John Bouhan, a major political player in Savannah from the 1940s to the late '60s. Daiss calls Seiler a "green attorney" at the time and not involved in politics himself but one who remembers the old political establishment.

"One of Bouhan's main strengths was his organization – staying in touch with people personally," Seiler is quoted as saying. "Those days it was worth being in politics because you could give jobs out. You were in control, could hire policemen, appoint officials."

Seiler retired in 2017.

== Personal life and death ==
Cecelia, Seiler's wife of 59 years, died in June 2014 at the age of 80.

The couple's daughter, Bess Thompson, appeared in the movie version of Midnight in the Garden of Good and Evil as the woman in Forsyth Park who asks if she can have her picture taken with Uga. They had two others daughters, Cecelia Swann Brannon and Sara Story, and son Charles Wilkins.

Seiler attended seventy consecutive Masters Tournaments, beginning with Ben Hogan's 1953 victory, when Seiler was a student at the University of Georgia.

He was a member of The Oglethorpe Club, located directly across Bull Street from Armstrong House.

Seiler died of cancer on August 28, 2023, at the age of 90. His funeral took place at the Lutheran Church of the Ascension in Savannah's Wright Square. He was interred in Bonaventure Cemetery.

== UGA mascots ==
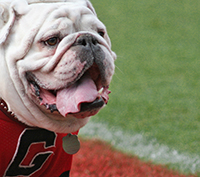
Uga VI

Since the 1950s, Seiler and his family have owned and maintained the unbroken line of live mascots of the University of Georgia sports teams, English bulldogs known successively as Uga I - XI.

The family received the first member of the line (today referred to as Uga I) in 1956, when Seiler was a second-year student at the University of Georgia School of Law and newly married to the former Cecelia Gunn. He was given the bulldog by a former beau of Gunn's, who intended to insult Seiler. The new puppy was said to be the grandson of a white bulldog who traveled with the Georgia football team to Pasadena, California, for the 1943 Rose Bowl.

On September 29, 1956, the Seilers brought Uga I with them to Sanford Stadium for the first Georgia Bulldogs football home game of the year, against the Florida State Seminoles. Dan Magill, the Sports Information Director for the UGA Athletic Association at the time, took notice of a picture of the dog from that game and suggested to UGA football head coach Wally Butts that Seiler have Uga attend subsequent games as the official team mascot. This began a tradition of Uga or one of his descendants being present at every University of Georgia football game, home and away.

His fifth successor, Uga VI, who, like his progenitors, was a pure white bulldog, maintained the tradition from 1999 until his death in 2008 at Seiler's Savannah home. Uga VII replaced Uga VI for the team's highly anticipated 2008 season; however, officials initially questioned the dog's readiness. Uga VII died on November 19, 2009, of congestive heart failure.

In its April 28, 1997 issue Sports Illustrated named Uga the nation's best college mascot.
