= Oglethorpe Mall =

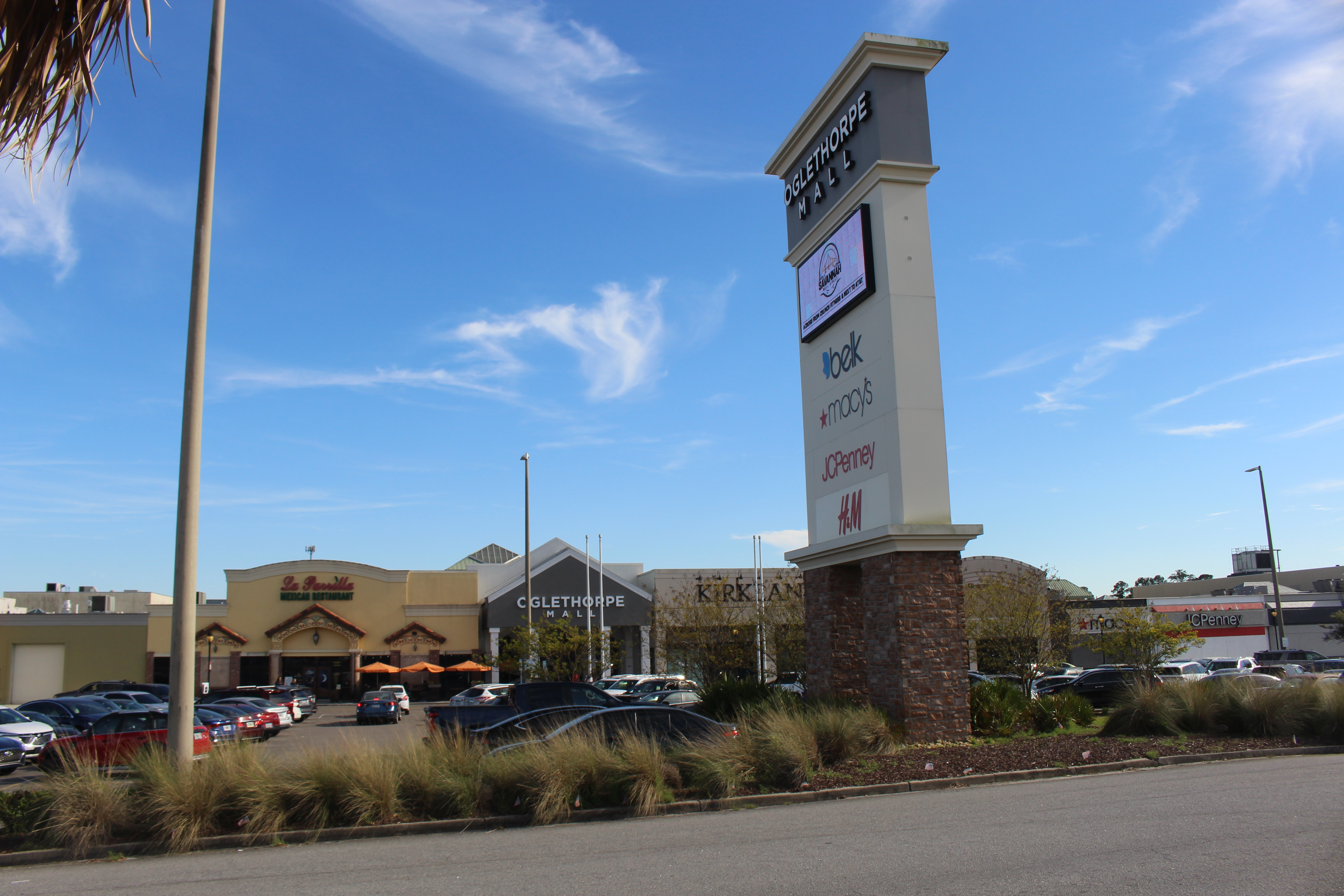
- Oglethorpe Mall, March 2023
- Location: Savannah, Georgia, United States
- Coordinates: 32.0034°N 81.1169°W
- Opened: April 1969 (renovated 1974, 1977, 1982, 1989, 1992, 2002, 2018)
- Developer: Scott Hudgens
- Manager: Brookfield Properties
- Owner: GGP
- Num. of stores: 105
- Num. of anchor tenants: 4 (3 open, 1 redeveloped)
- Floor area: 943,801 sq ft (87,682.0 m^{2}) (GLA)
- Floors: 1 (2 in Belk, Macy's and former Sears)
- Parking: 5,348 spaces (including parking deck)
- Website: www.oglethorpemall.com/en.html

Oglethorpe Mall is a super-regional shopping mall on the south side of Savannah, Georgia.

Named after General James Oglethorpe, the founder of Savannah, the mall has expanded since its opening in 1969 to nearly one million square feet. Among its features are several restaurants, a food court, and 118 stores. It is anchored by Belk, JCPenney, and Macy's. The center also features junior anchors Barnes & Noble, Old Navy, H&M, DSW, and Crunch Fitness. It is owned and operated by Brookfield Properties.

The former Sears at the mall was converted into new apartments which were finished and completed by 2026. The new apartment complex on the mall grounds in known as Madison Oak.

== History ==
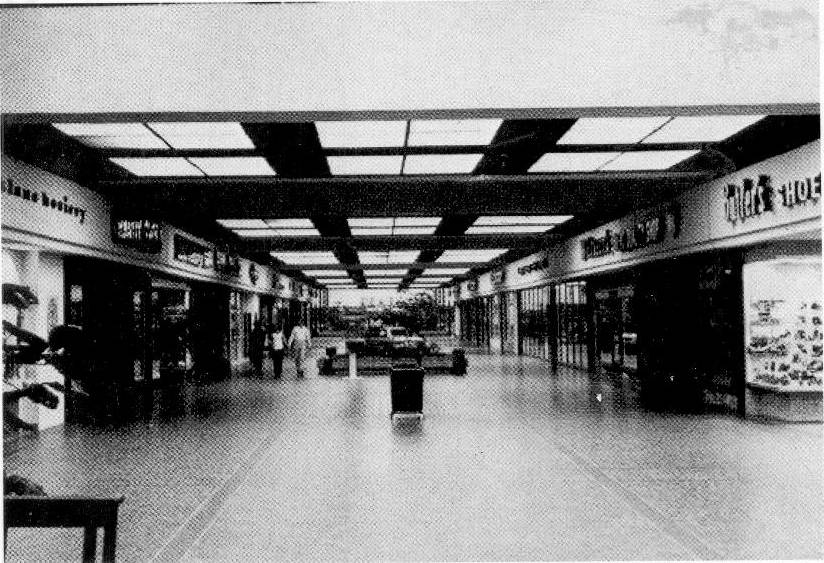
Center Court of Oglethorpe Mall, 1977.

=== 1967-1988 ===
The land the mall is located on is called the Chippewa Tract, created by a 1960 subdivision of former farmland. Originally developed by Scott Hugdins of Atlanta, ground was broken in 1968. Sears and Belk developed their own stores in tandem with the mall.

Oglethorpe Mall opened in April 1969 at 7804 Abercorn Street as Savannah's first enclosed, air-conditioned shopping mall. The main anchors were Belk-Beery, McCrory, Adler's, and Sears. At the time, the mall featured Savannah's only Chick-fil-A restaurant. Other major tenants included Morrison's Cafeteria and a Piggly Wiggly. By 1974, an additional 25,000-square-foot (2,300 m^{2}) of retail space was added.

Additional growth came in 1982 when a 230,000-square-foot (21,000 m^{2}) expansion was completed featuring JCPenney and local department store, Levy's. In February 1986, Levy's was folded into Maas Brothers of Tampa, Florida, which was also owned by Allied Department Stores. In 1985, Adler's closed and became a section of the mall known as The Promenade: A short mall entrance hallway lined with upscale stores such as Laura Ashley. By 1988 Maas Brothers was consolidated into Jordan Marsh, another major Allied chain based in Florida and New England.

=== 1989-2009 ===
By 1987, national mall developer, The Rouse Company was planning a new mall on 85 acres of land two miles south of Oglethorpe Mall. The proposed Southlake Mall received significant pushback from nearby residents and The Rouse Company pulled out. Meanwhile, David Hocker & Associates began planning a new mall to open in the summer of 1990 four miles south of Oglethorpe Mall. This mall opened on August 29, 1990, as Savannah Mall.

In order to combat mounting pressure from newer competition, a significant renovation began in 1989. The renovations changed the feel of the mall altogether featuring "coastal" design elements like whitewashed wood, tabby walls, and lighter paint choices. The mall is extensively lit during the day by natural lighting from skylights that were installed during the renovation. A new tile floor was installed and would win design awards in 1990. A new two-level parking garage completed the renovations in the summer of 1990. Further consolidation saw the closure of Jordan Marsh in September 1991, as the southern stores were folded in Burdine's, which did not operate in Georgia. In 1992, the Maas Brothers/Jordan Marsh store was converted into general mall space, and a new 135,000-square-foot (12,500 m^{2}) Rich's was added to the mall. McCrory left the mall in 1994 and was replaced by Stein Mart the following year. In 1998, Morrison's Cafeteria became Piccadilly Cafeteria as they bought Morrison's and rebranded the locations.

The Promenade was converted into a Barnes & Noble which opened in 2000. A new food court opened in 2002 in abandoned mall space that had previously operated as Piggly Wiggly and a back mall entrance. The food court allowed for relocated storefronts for Chick-fil-A and Sbarro which previously had locations at the entry of what would eventually become the food court wing. Both are now Claire's and Underground by Journeys respectively. The Abercorn Street façade was extensively upgraded throughout the 2000s and Rich's became Macy's in 2005. Also throughout 2005 the mall introduced several new retailers to the market including Forever 21, Build-A-Bear Workshop, Hollister Co., Nine West, and Aldo.

=== 2010-present ===
In March 2016, Piccadilly Cafeteria closed after 47 years of business. It was replaced in 2018 by DSW. On August 22, 2018, Sears announced that it would be closing in November 2018 as part of a plan to close 46 stores nationwide. Also in 2018 the mall received its most significant renovation since 2002. This included an updated logo along with new street signs at the highway entrances, as well as new tile flooring in some areas. In 2020, longstanding tenant Stein Mart closed as the company liquidated.

On February 24, 2022, developer Madison Capital was granted approval to rezone the former Sears tract to multi-family. This paved the way for the anchor building to be demolished for more than 200 apartments. The entire site was then redeveloped and the apartment complex was opened by 2026. The new apartment complex is known as Madison Oaks.

In Fall 2022, Crunch Fitness took the place of the former Stein Mart. Throughout 2021 the space was occupied by Overstock Furniture & Mattress.

On July 2, 2025, three people, including a juvenile, were shot in a shooting inside the mall. Officials later confirmed that three other people suffered non-gunshot-related injuries.

== List of anchor stores ==
| Name | No. of floors | Year opened | Year closed | Notes |
|---|---|---|---|---|
| Belk | 2 | 1969 | —N/a | |
| JCPenney | 1 | 1982 | —N/a | |
| Levy's of Savannah | 1 | 1982 | 1986 | Became Maas Brothers/Jordan Marsh |
| Maas Brothers/Jordan Marsh | 1 | 1986 | 1991 | Converted into inline mall space |
| Macy's | 2 | 2005 | —N/a | Former Rich's |
| Rich's | 2 | 1992 | 2005 | Added onto expansion wing built from Maas Brothers/Jordan Marsh |
| Sears | 2 | 1969 | 2018 | Demolished for apartments |
