= Georgia Southern University–Armstrong Campus =

Public university in Savannah, Georgia, US

Georgia Southern University Armstrong Campus
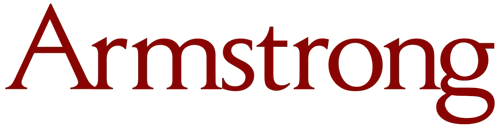
- Logo for Armstrong State University, prior to consolidation with Georgia Southern
- Former names: Armstrong Junior College (1935–1948), Armstrong College of Savannah (1948–1964), Armstrong State College (1964–1996), Armstrong Atlantic State University (1996–2014), Armstrong State University (2014–2018)
- Type: Public research university
- Established: 1935 (as Armstrong Junior College)
- Parent institution: Georgia Southern University
- Academic affiliations: Space-grant
- President: Dr. Kyle Marrero
- Faculty: 292
- Students: 5,278
- Location: Savannah, Georgia, United States; 31.979°N 81.160°W
- Campus: Suburban
- Website: georgiasouthern.edu/armstrong-campus

Georgia Southern University–Armstrong Campus, formerly Armstrong State University, is one of four campuses of Georgia Southern University, a public university in the U.S. state of Georgia. Occupying a 268-acre (1.08 km^{2}) area on the residential southside of Savannah, Georgia, the school became one of three campuses of Georgia Southern University in 2018. The university's flagship campus is in Statesboro, 50 miles (80 km) west of Savannah. The Armstrong campus is located approximately 15 miles (24 km) from downtown Savannah and 25 miles (40 km) from Tybee Island. Armstrong offers undergraduate and graduate degrees; it has a total student enrollment of approximately 5,000 students.

== History ==
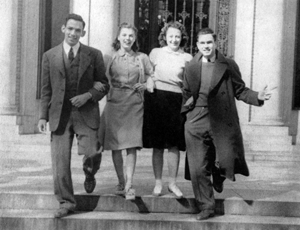
Students of Armstrong College (circa 1950).

The Armstrong campus was founded as Armstrong Junior College in 1935 by Mayor Thomas Gamble. Gamble pursued the issue during the height of the Great Depression to benefit Savannah's youth and the community, as well as aid in stimulating the local economy. The college was originally located in the historic Armstrong House adjacent to Forsyth Park in downtown Savannah. The mansion was given to the city as a gift from the family of George F. Armstrong, a local businessman involved in the shipping industry. The college eventually grew to encompass six buildings in the Forsyth and Monterey Square areas of Savannah.

In 1959, Armstrong College of Savannah became part of the University System of Georgia as a community college, and in 1964 the Board of Regents conferred four-year status on Armstrong State College. Donald Livingston and the Mills B. Lane Foundation provided the college with 250 acres of land on the southwest side of Savannah. Eight buildings were constructed on the property and the college moved from the Armstrong House downtown to the suburban location in January 1966.

The school played NCAA Division I athletics briefly, from 1983 to 1987, as part of the Big South Conference. The school later dropped athletics.

Over the years the college expanded, adding new buildings and expanding academic programs. In 1993, the college began extensive landscaping work that transformed the campus into an arboretum. Armstrong State College gained state university status in 1996 and duly changed its name to Armstrong Atlantic State University. The following year the university opened the Liberty Center in Hinesville. The university celebrated its 75th anniversary in 2010, inaugurating Dr. Linda M. Bleicken as its seventh president.

In 2014 the school officially changed its name to Armstrong State University, to help minimize confusion regarding the school's location, make the name easier to say, and create a stronger brand for the school. The name change became effective on July 1, 2014.

Armstrong celebrated its 80th anniversary and the 50th anniversary of the university's move to the Southside during the 2015–16 academic year.

Presently, the campus is no longer an independent institution with a separate accreditation.

=== Consolidation with Georgia Southern University ===
On January 11, 2017, the Board of Regents of the University System of Georgia, on recommendation by Chancellor Steve Wrigley, voted to consolidate Armstrong State with Georgia Southern University. The merger, without any student-faculty input from the two schools, was to take place as part of a long-term goal of the Board of Regents to consolidate smaller, regional colleges and universities with larger, more well-known institutions. Under the consolidation plan, Armstrong State would inherit Georgia Southern's name, leadership, academics, and athletics, and the merged institution would become the fourth-largest public university in the state: the "New Georgia Southern University". Consolidation, which took a full year to implement, was officially proclaimed by the Board of Regents on January 17, 2018.

== Campus ==
The Armstrong campus is located in a suburban setting near the Savannah Mall, with direct access to downtown Savannah via Abercorn Expressway. The landscaped campus includes subtropical ferns and flowers, southern magnolias, oak trees draped with Spanish moss, and a wide variety of native plants scattered throughout the 268-acre (1,084,557.5 m^{2}) arboretum-style grounds.

Lane Library is the main academic and research library on the Armstrong campus. Lane Library's collection comprises more than 200,000 books and printed materials as well as 18,000 audiovisual works. The university recently invested $5 million in a renovation and expansion of the facility.

The Science Center complex is a two-building complex connected by an enclosed glass walkway. The Science Center is home to many of the College of Science and Technology programs, including Biology, Chemistry, Physics, Computer Science, Physical Science, and Psychology. It includes classroom and lecture space, faculty offices, and labs. The 126,056-square-foot (11,711.0 m^{2}) facility opened in 2001 as the largest single increase in instructional space on campus since the campus opened.

A 61,000-square-foot (5,700 m^{2}), $24 million Student Union opened in 2010. It is the university's first green building, built with rapidly renewable and recycled materials and featuring a high-efficiency chilled water cooling system. The Union houses a 300-seat food court (known as the Galley), 200-seat movie theatre, ballroom, bookstore, coffeehouse, convenience store, and expansive porches and lounges. Next to the Student Union is the Memorial College Center. Commonly known as the MCC, it houses Student Affairs and Student Activities offices.

Armstrong's athletic facilities are located in the southeast area of campus. The Student Recreation and Aquatic Center is a 38,000-square-foot (3,500 m^{2}) athletic facility that includes a 5,200-square-foot (480 m^{2}) fitness center, and two basketball courts. The facility is home to the ROTC program and was formerly home to the Armstrong Pirate volleyball team. The Alumni Arena is located adjacent to the Rec Center and includes an indoor running track, weight room, coaches offices, classroom space, and a 4,000-seat arena home to the men's and women's basketball teams. Since consolidation with Georgia Southern, the campus has not maintained a separate athletics program, with the future of these athletic facilities uncertain. Near the end of the 2017–2018 academic year, there were talks of renovating the campus's current athletic facilities to allow for the university's tennis and soccer teams to practice and play at the Armstrong Campus, in addition to creating new recreational and general purpose fields. Such a proposal, if approved, could take up to a decade to complete, with the entire project having a low-end cost of $40 million to upgrade the campus's current athletic facilities, including infrastructure needs as mandated by division standards.

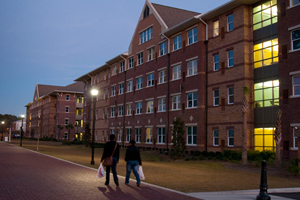
Windward Commons, which opened in 2010, is a suite-style residential community on the Armstrong campus.

More than 1,400 students live on campus within three residential communities located in the southwest portion of the campus. Windward Commons is Armstrong's suite-style freshmen residential community which opened in 2010 and is home to nearly 600 students. It features private and semi-private suites, music practice rooms, multipurpose classrooms, lounges/social areas, laundry facilities, courtyards with outdoor sitting space and barbecue areas, and two classrooms. Compass Point and University Crossings are apartment-style residence halls intended for upperclassmen and graduate students.

On April 24, 2013, Armstrong completed renovations to the Memorial College Center, opening the Learning Commons. The 14,000-square-foot (1,300 m^{2}) space was developed as an extension to the Lane Library. Features include PC and Mac computers, three multi-touch tables, and group study rooms.

== Academics ==
Armstrong features more than 100 academic programs and offers bachelor's degrees, master's degrees, and doctoral degrees through its College of Education, College of Health Professions, College of Liberal Arts, College of Science and Technology, and Graduate Studies programs. In addition, the school offers a Doctorate of Physical Therapy. The campus is classified as a Master’s college and university by the Carnegie Classification of Institutions of Higher Education. For the 2010–11 academic year, Armstrong was not ranked and deemed a Tier 2 university by U.S. News & World Report. The university has full accreditation from the Commission on Colleges of the Southern Association of Colleges and Schools. The university does not utilize graduate students to teach classes as all are taught by members of the Armstrong faculty. Armstrong has nearly 300 faculty members and a student-to-faculty ratio of 19:1. The university offers study abroad and honors programs and opportunities for undergraduates to participate in research across a variety of disciplines.

=== College of Education ===
Armstrong's College of Education offers degree programs via two primary departments: Childhood & Exceptional Student Education and Adolescent & Adult Education. The programs prepare graduates for the education field as well as other positions in education administration. In 2010 the college received continued accreditation through 2017 under performance-oriented standards of the National Council for Accreditation of Teacher Education (NCATE).

=== College of Health Professions ===
The College of Health Professionals is the largest academic college at Armstrong in terms of enrollment. The college offers a range of academic programs that prepare students for careers in nursing, public health, health administration, and the allied health professions. It confers degrees ranging from associate's through master's and doctoral.

=== College of Liberal Arts ===
Liberal arts have been the foundation of education at Armstrong since its founding. The College of Liberal Arts includes various departments and interdisciplinary programs that prepare graduates for careers in government, criminal justice, law, business, and entertainment. Students in the College of Liberal Arts study the arts, humanities, and social sciences in classroom environments and through internships, performances, exhibitions, undergraduate research projects, and study abroad programs. Departments include Art, Music and Theatre, Criminal Justice, Social & Political Science, Economics, History, Languages, Literature & Philosophy, Interdisciplinary Programs, and Military Science/ROTC.

=== College of Science and Technology ===
The College of Science and Technology at Armstrong has a strong emphasis on student research opportunities that prepare students for graduate programs. Areas of study in the College of Science and Technology includes: Biology, Chemistry & Physics, Computer Science & Information Technology, Biochemistry, Engineering, Mathematics, and Psychology.

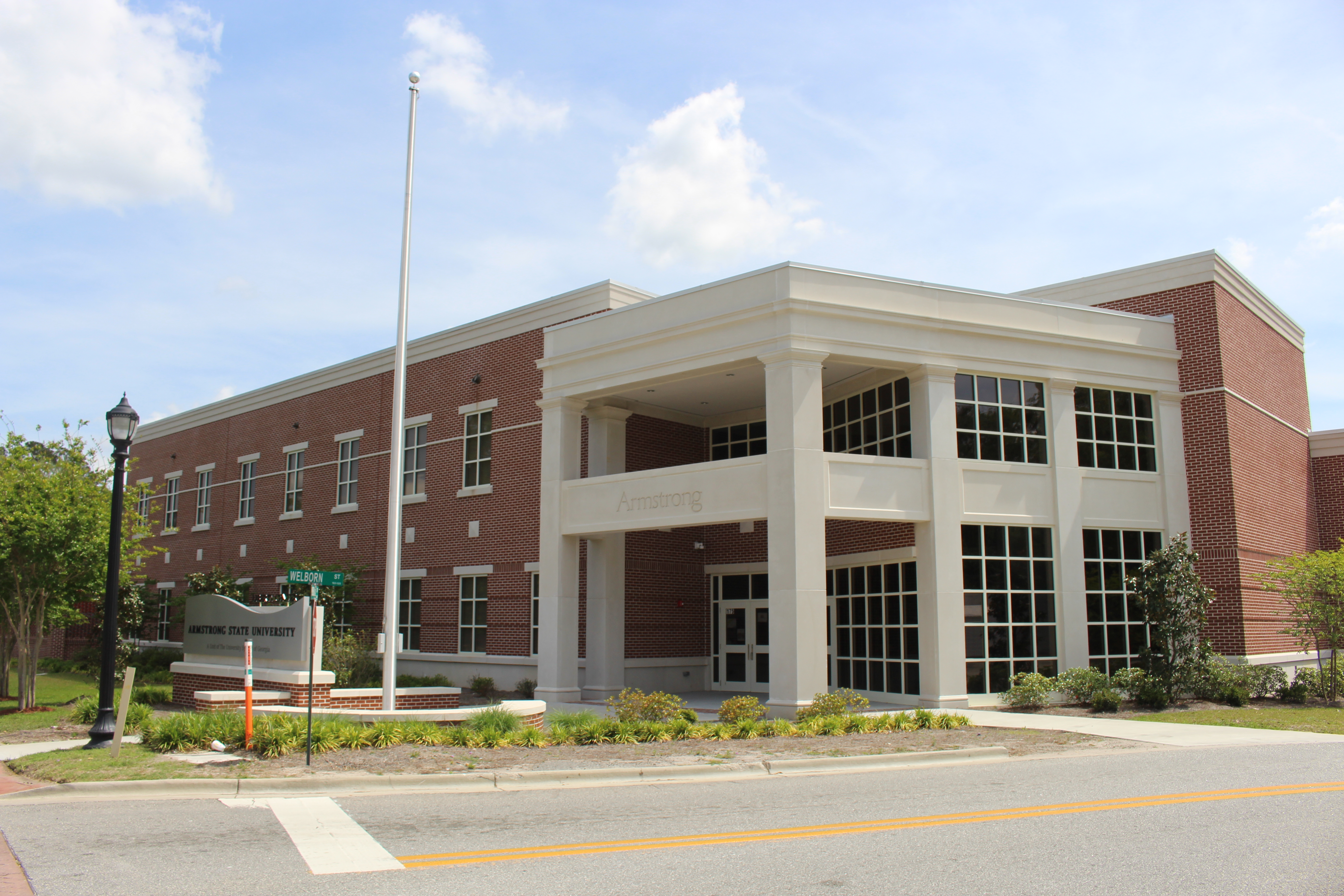
Liberty Campus

=== Liberty Campus ===
The Liberty Campus in Hinesville, which offers select academic programs to residents of Liberty County and surrounding areas, serves as the third campus of Georgia Southern, which operates under the Armstrong Campus. The Liberty Campus provides special services to Fort Stewart military personnel and their families. A variety of programs are offered or supported, including associate’s degrees in arts and applied sciences, and bachelor's degrees in criminal justice, nursing, early childhood education, middle grades education, and liberal studies, with plans to develop consortium programs with Savannah State University in the upcoming years.

The Liberty Campus's current facilities opened in downtown Hinesville in January 2016.

== Student life ==
Armstrong offers many opportunities for students to participate in extracurricular programs, organizations, performances, forums, and athletics. The university has over 100 student organizations and an expanding Greek life system with nine fraternity and sorority organizations. The Student Government Association, Graduate Student Coordinating Council, and University Programming Board (formerly known as CUB, for Campus Union Board, prior to consolidation) offer many opportunities for involvement, leadership, and entertainment. The Inkwell is the university's student-run award-winning publication, published every Thursday during the semester. The university also sponsors a number of recreational intramural and club sports, including dance, flag football, tennis, rugby, ultimate Frisbee, baseball, bowling, basketball, and billiards. The Calliope was Armstrong's student literature and art magazine. It received a First Place/Special Merit award from the American Scholastic Press Association in 2010, but was retired following the consolidation.

Celebrate Armstrong occurs in October and is planned by the University Programming Board (UPB). Celebrate Armstrong consists of different kinds of activities, entertainment, and competitions. The UPB also hosted the annual Big Show in the spring, a concert that has included performances from Gym Class Heroes, Maroon 5, and Migos.

The campus offers numerous volunteering opportunities to give back to the local community. The campus started the Initiative for Civic Engagement in 2009, making community service an active part of the curriculum. Hundreds of students, faculty, staff, and alumni turn out for joint outreach projects or the biannual Treasure Savannah Day of Service.

=== Student Government Association ===
The Student Government Association (SGA) for the Armstrong Campus consists of an executive and a legislative branch. The first student association on the campus was the Armstrong Student Association, founded by Armstrong Junior College's inaugural class in 1935. SGA's current system has existed since the summer of 2018, when the constitution for the post-consolidation Georgia Southern University took effect.

In addition to the university-wide SGA President, the executive branch consists of an Executive Vice President, who chairs the Campus Executive Board for the Armstrong Campus, which includes the Executive Vice President, the Chief of Staff, other vice-president positions with their own specialty (e.g. for financial or academic affairs), and officers. The Campus Executive Board consists of elected and appointed officers and serves as an advisory body for the campus's University administrators.

The legislative branch consists of a Senate, led by a Speaker, who presides over meetings of the Senate. The Senate consists of Senators representing the colleges housed on the Armstrong Campus (currently, the Colleges of Education, Health Professions, and Public Health), as well as two additional "colleges": Graduate Studies and At-Large, to ensure that graduate students and students whose major is not housed on the Armstrong Campus, respectively, are still represented. In addition to presiding over the Senate, the Speaker also chairs the Senate Advisory Council, which consists of the Speaker and other officers of the Senate Leadership, such as the Deputy Speaker, Senate Whip, Parliamentarian, and the chairs for the Senate's various standing committees.

The Liberty Campus is represented by the Armstrong Campus, and includes a semi-autonomous Governing Board, led by an elected Director, and a Student Council, led by the assistant director.

== Athletics (1935–2017) ==
Armstrong State University's consolidation with Georgia Southern spelled an end for Armstrong's athletics, being announced on March 7, 2017, that Armstrong's athletic program would be discontinued at the conclusion of the 2016–17 academic year.

Armstrong's athletic teams were called the Pirates. The university was a member at the Division II ranks of the National Collegiate Athletic Association (NCAA) as a charter member of the Peach Belt Conference (PBC) from the conference's inception in 1990–91 to their final season of competition at the end of the 2016–17 academic year.

Until 2016–17, Armstrong competed in twelve intercollegiate varsity sports, five men's and seven women's: Men's sports included baseball, basketball, cross country, golf, and tennis; while women's sports included basketball, cross country, golf, soccer, softball, tennis and volleyball.

=== History ===
Athletics at Armstrong began at the start of the school's history in the 1930s with its teams known as the Geechees. The school won state championships as a junior college in 1938 in men's basketball and men's tennis. Athletics were suspended during World War II. Following the war, the college added new athletic programs, and in 1948 men's basketball won a second state championship.

Armstrong joined the National Association of Intercollegiate Athletics (NAIA) in 1967 and became known as the Pirates after the college became a four-year institution. In 1973, it joined the National Collegiate Athletic Association (NCAA) and became a member of the South Atlantic Conference (SAC) with in-state rivals Valdosta State College (now Valdosta State University), Columbus College (now Columbus State University), and Augusta College (now Augusta University). In 1983, Armstrong State College upgraded athletics to NCAA Division I and became a charter member of the Big South Conference in 1985. Soon after, in 1987, the Pirates returned to Division II, becoming a charter member of the Peach Belt Conference in 1990.

Armstrong holds 96 PBC championships. In addition, the university has appeared in 139 NCAA Championships, winning 13 titles. Armstrong has produced 296 All-Americans. The Armstrong men's and women's tennis teams have combined to capture 10 NCAA Division II national championships over the last nine seasons.
