= J. B. White =

Former department store chain in the US

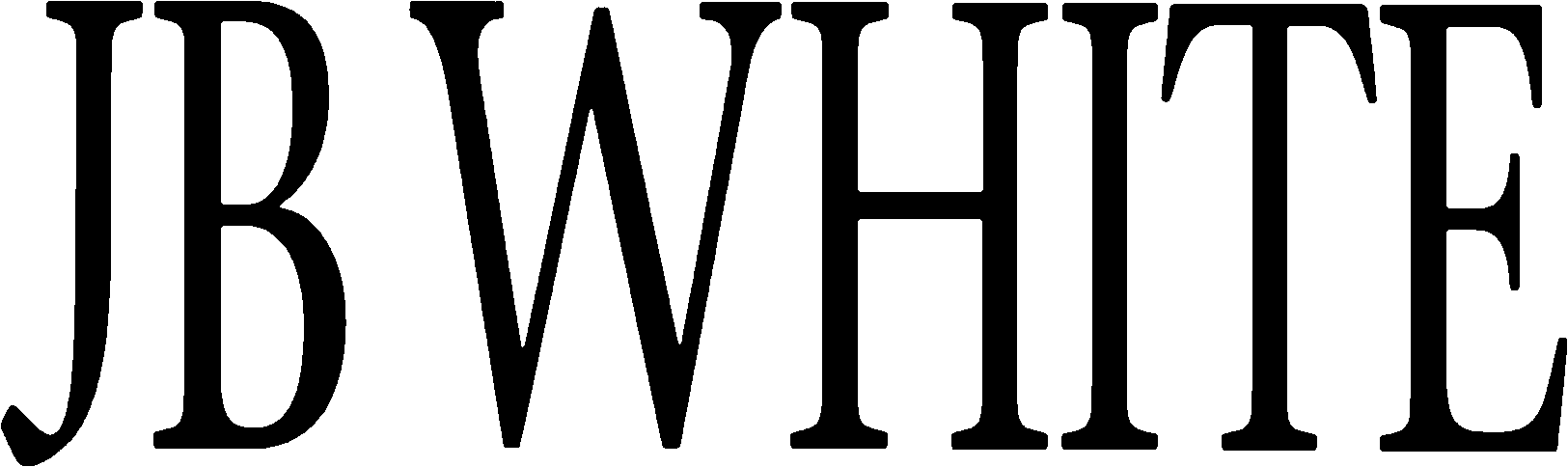
JB White's final logo

J. B. White was a department store chain in the Southeastern United States founded in Augusta, Georgia, in 1874 by James Brice White, an Irish immigrant. In the early 1910s, White sold the store to the H.B. Claflin & Company, owner of Lord & Taylor. The store's initial offerings included clothing, furniture, appliances and community programs.

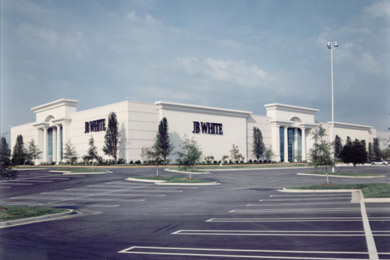
A J.B. White store

Owned by now-defunct Mercantile Stores for most of its existence, most locations of the chain were in South Carolina, though locations existed in Augusta and Savannah. In Augusta, the original downtown store added two suburban branches, a clothing store at the National Hills shopping center and a homegoods only location in the Daniel Village shopping center (a former Belk). A homegoods store opened at National Hills in the space formerly occupied by a two screen movie theater. In 1978, the store left its longtime downtown flagship for a new one at Regency Mall, then twenty years later J.B. White moved to its last flagship location at Augusta Mall in 1998, shortly before the sale to Dillard's. The Savannah location opened at Savannah Mall in 1990. Most locations became Dillard's when the Mercantile Stores chain was sold in 1998 for $2.9 billion (~$5.19 billion in 2024); some J. B. White locations in overlapping areas became Belk.

The defunct store on Broad Street Augusta, Georgia, was purchased in June 2007 to be converted into condominiums.
