= Regency Mall (Augusta, Georgia) =

Defunct shopping mall in Augusta, Georgia, US

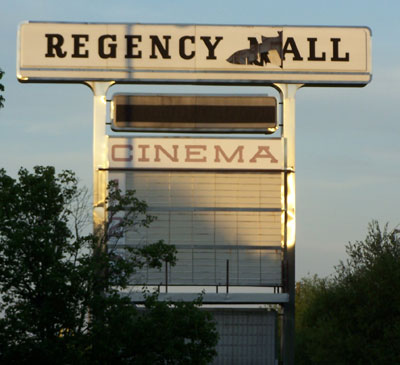
- Abandoned 1970s-era exterior sign
- Location: Augusta, Georgia, U.S.
- Coordinates: 33.440226°N 82.029641°W
- Address: 1700 Gordon Highway
- Opened: July 27, 1978
- Closed: March 2002 (partially demolished October 2020)
- Developer: Edward J. DeBartolo Corporation
- Owner: Cardinal Group Management
- Num. of stores: 139 at peak
- Num. of anchor tenants: 4
- Floor area: 800,000 sq ft (74,000 m^{2})
- Floors: 2

Regency Mall was a major regional mall in South Augusta, Georgia, United States. Located at 1700 Gordon Highway, Regency Mall was open from 1978 to 2002. It was anchored by J.B. White (now Dillard's), Belk (Belk-Howard, but signed as Belk), Montgomery Ward and Cullum's (later Meyers-Arnold and Uptons), and also featured a three-screen movie General Cinema theatre. Developed by the Edward J. DeBartolo Corporation, Regency Mall was Augusta's first shopping mall, opening one week before Augusta Mall.

Never updated during its lifespan, Regency Mall failed due to crime and security problems, a poor location and a market too small to support two shopping malls. Its anchor stores began to pull out during the early 1990s. Regency's last remaining anchor, Montgomery Ward, closed when the chain folded in 2001. The mall was boarded up in March 2002 shortly after its last tenant, International Formal Wear, closed, but the buildings' interiors remained mostly intact. As of December 2013, in order to prevent any further vandalism and fires set by homeless people, transients, and squatters breaking into the mall, Regency Mall's whole interior along with the interiors of its four anchor stores were completely gutted of all combustible materials after the City of Augusta and Richmond County officials had ordered the malls owner to either fully secure the facility in order to bring it up to 2013-2014 Richmond County and City of Augusta fire codes or demolish it. Demolition work on the mall commenced in October 2020, starting with the former Montgomery Ward's building; however, no further advancements have been made on the project since that time.

== History ==
=== Development (1978–1980s) ===
Regency Mall was originally planned as part of the "Regency Square" development, which included condominiums, a shopping plaza and a hotel. Frank Barrios, who served as the first manager for Regency Mall, said in 1978 that the mall's location, at the intersection of U.S. 1 and Gordon Highway, was chosen because it was the center of population for the Central Savannah River Area and had excellent accessibility.

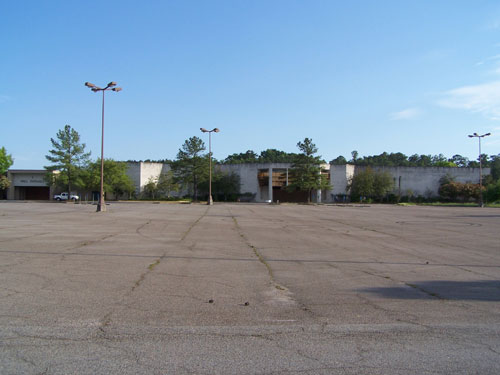
Still standing, but abandoned. The Belk building, seen here, was completed one year after Regency Mall opened.

Construction of Regency Mall began in 1976. Montgomery Ward, Belk and J.B. White were the first anchor stores to announce locations at Regency Mall. JCPenney considered building a store at Regency Mall, but decided against it, instead choosing later to move into Augusta Mall. Cullum's announced in early 1978 that it would build a store at the mall, becoming the fourth anchor.

Regency Mall was configured in a Y-shaped layout. Its surrounding landscape was terraced, providing ground-level entrances to the upper and lower levels. The mall's interior was decorated in an alabaster motif with brown accents, and its floors were finished in brown-speckled terrazzo tile. Live trees were planted at intervals along the lower-level concourses. The mall's three wings met at a 28,000-square-foot (2,600 m^{2}) center court, framed by 45-foot (14 m) pillars and featuring a fountain, a 28-foot (9 m) clock tower and a stage area floored in brown tile. Regency Mall had more than 800,000 square feet (70,000 m^{2}) of space; when it opened, it was the largest enclosed shopping mall in Georgia.

Regency Mall's grand opening took place on July 27, 1978, with 70 of its 139 scheduled stores ready for business. Many of the smaller stores in the mall opened over the following weeks. Cullum's, still under construction at the time the mall opened, did not open until later in 1978, and Belk's Regency Mall store was not completed until 1979.

Augusta Mall, seven miles (11 km) from Regency Mall, opened for business on August 3, 1978. Developed by the Rouse Company, Augusta Mall had been in the planning stages since 1972; however, its construction had been delayed due to economic uncertainty. The smaller Augusta Mall had 100 stores but only two anchors, Rich's and Davison's; both of these were Atlanta-based chains, while Regency Mall featured a combination of Georgia-based and national chains. However, both malls operated successfully through the 1970s and much of the 1980s. They had drawn large retailers to close their downtown stores and relocate to the malls, and many smaller stores had opened stores in one, or both, of the malls.

=== Trouble ahead (1990s) ===
Though Regency Mall was the largest mall in Augusta, its location posed problems during the 1990s. Augusta Mall tended to draw shoppers from the central and western portions of Augusta. Regency Mall, located in south Augusta, tended to draw customers from the southern, eastern and northern portions of the Augusta area, and also drew business from service personnel stationed at nearby Fort Gordon.

Regency Mall also suffered by not being located near expressways or interstate highways. In contrast, Augusta Mall was located just off the Bobby Jones Expressway (I-520) and was approximately two miles from Interstate 20. Regency Mall was not near any such thoroughfares; instead, it was located at the intersection of two traditional highways, in a part of town that was slowly deteriorating.

Security at Regency Mall also became an issue as the 1980s wore on, leading to a perception that the mall was not a safe place to visit. Both Augusta Mall and Regency Mall had faced security problems by 1985. But in March 1986, a 16-year-old was abducted from a parking lot at Regency Mall. She was raped and shot four times, and her body was found several days later near Hephzibah, Georgia. Three years later, an 18-year-old woman was shot by a man who was hiding in the back seat of her car, leaving her paralyzed; her family filed suit against DeBartolo, claiming that security at Regency Mall was inadequate.

A further blow came in 1990, when Augusta Mall completed a $32 million renovation and expansion. The centerpiece of the expansion was a new Sears store, which replaced the chain's freestanding store near Broad street at the intersection of Walton Way and 15th Street. In addition, the mall's interior was updated and expanded, growing from around 90 stores to more than 130 stores. In contrast, Regency Mall remained essentially unchanged from its original configuration, and its interior seemed dark and dated compared to that of its freshened cross-town rival. DeBartolo held out hope that a new fifth anchor store could still become a reality. However, through location, renovation and growth, Augusta Mall was on its way to becoming the region's dominant mall.

=== Decline (1993–1999) ===
The first anchor store to close at Regency Mall was Upton's, which occupied the space originally built for Cullum's; its Regency Mall store closed in April 1993. Seven other stores in the mall closed by the end of that year. Some merchants who were leaving the mall said that the mall was not generating enough traffic to justify remaining at the mall. One said she did not see the mall "having any kind of future" the way it was. Another merchant claimed that the mall's management "doesn't seem to want to work with its tenants." Though some new businesses moved in, some of these were small businesses instead of franchised outlets; for example, a comic book store moved into a vacant store on the second level. However, the mall was steadily becoming deserted.

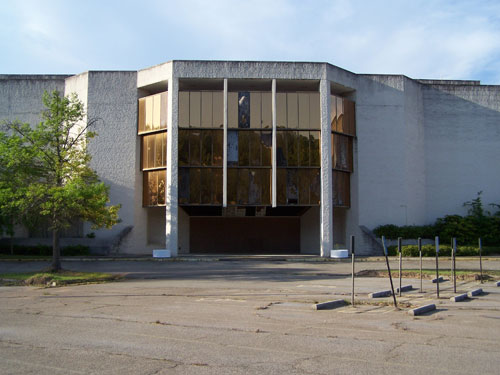
The Belk building, seen from the lower level. The dark smoked mirrorglass, the white-painted bricks and the building's exterior configuration are classic 1970s design cues.

DeBartolo Family Associates transferred the mall to mortgage holder Equitable Real Estate in 1995; as part of the deal, a $12.5 million debt owed by DeBartolo was forgiven. Equitable sold the mall in 1997 to Regency Mall, LLC, formed by Raleigh developers Haywood Whichard and Paul Woo, who specialized in buying and reselling distressed mall properties. Whichard and Woo bought the mall, valued at $33.5 million in 1991 tax records, for less than $4.15 million. In hopes of attracting business, lease rates were set as low as $3.50 per square foot, compared to the $9–$18 per square foot charged elsewhere in the surrounding area. Though a few businesses moved to the mall, they were not enough to turn business around. The mall continued to lose tenants. Whichard and Woo said that the mall needed to be renovated to attract new tenants, but Woo said that the two were not willing to risk the $15 to $30 million such renovations would require.

Other tenants fell as the years passed. Belk closed its Outlet Center at Regency Mall in August 1996. General Cinema closed its three-screen theatre at Regency Mall that same year. Two years later, JB White closed its Regency Mall store and opened a new store at Augusta Mall, leaving Montgomery Ward as the only anchor left at the mall. The management of that store boarded up its mall entrances to save on heating and cooling costs. The mall's escalators were shut off to save money, and management scaled back the hours of operation. Even with these and other economic measures, the mall lost money each day it was open. Occupancy was, at most, 35 percent.

Local government officials had eyed Regency Mall for years as a possible location for city and county operations. In 1996, the Augusta Chronicle reported that Augusta Mayor Larry Sconyers and other commissioners conducted a behind-the-scenes effort to buy the mall and relocate government offices there. Though this plan was not carried through, another proposal was made two years later to consolidate all of Augusta-Richmond County's government operations there, and to convert the Belk building into a court facility. Though some in Augusta hailed the plan as an opportunity to revitalize the flagging South Augusta area, critics said that the plan would have contradicted Augusta's efforts to revitalize the downtown and riverfront areas. The Augusta Chronicle criticized the $90 million proposal as "far-out" and "off-the-wall." In the end, these plans never went forward.

There appeared to be new life for Regency Mall at the start of 1999, with reports of an impending sale to a developer who planned to convert it into an outlet mall. One report announced prematurely that the mall had been sold to AMC Development, that upscale retailers such as FAO Schwarz and Nike would relocate to the mall, and that the mall would be converted into an entertainment center with amusement park rides, a hotel, an ice rink, specialty shops and office space. However, though AMC and the Whichard-Woo partnership were reportedly close to a deal, the sale never went through. Whichard and Woo then tried to sell the property at auction, but could draw no bids higher than $2.3 million. Whichard finally bought out Woo's share for $2.7 million in an April 1999 foreclosure auction, but Woo continued to manage the property. Whichard then tried, without success, to sell the property to Augusta-Richmond County. In the meantime, some of the mall's vacant store space was used by organizers for the Georgia Games.

=== The end (2000–2003) ===
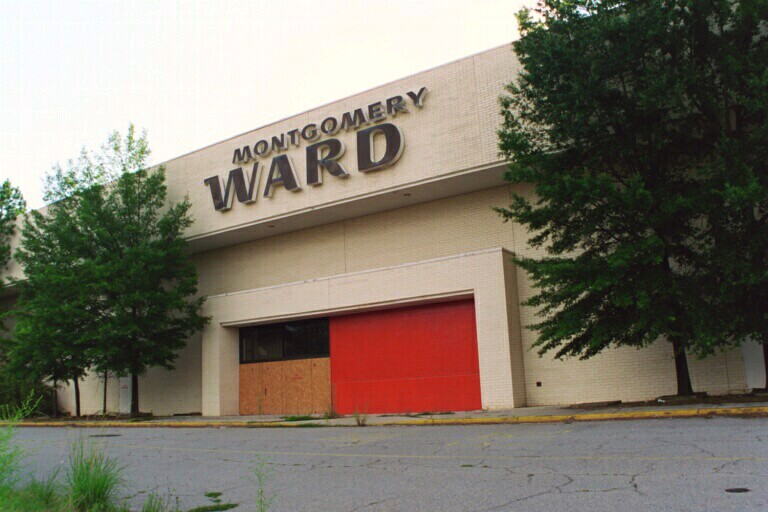
Montgomery Ward's closure in 2001 lead to the final demise of the Regency Mall.

Montgomery Ward's parent company announced in December 2000 that it would close all remaining stores in 2001. Regency Mall's management said that though Montgomery Ward would be closing, the mall would remain open. However, only 5 stores remained by this time: Montgomery Ward, Foot Locker, International Formal Wear, which had been one of the mall's original tenants in 1978, a teen clinic, and a substation for the Richmond County Marshals Department. Foot Locker closed its Regency Mall location sometime in January 2001. The teen clinic closed in March 2001. Montgomery Ward closed in June 2001, leaving just International Formal Wear and the county marshals’ substation. International Formal closed around January 2002 and opened a new store on Wrightsboro Road near Augusta Mall, leaving only the county marshals' substation. During the first few months after the closing of International Formal Wear, the mall's concourse was used for some events like church or dance and yoga classes, even though all of the mall's stores were closed. The mall closed its doors for good in March 2002, and its entrances were boarded up. However, the marshals' substation remained open.

In 2002, Whichard sold his stake in Regency Mall, which included everything but the Montgomery Ward building, to Cardinal Entities of Mattituck, New York for $3.5 million. Ownership of the Montgomery Ward building changed that year, as well, passing to Charleston, South Carolina-based Commercial Property Holdings. Cardinal had hoped to revitalize the mall by offering a lease-purchase package to Augusta-Richmond County for office space, and by attracting new tenants to the mall. Cardinal had plans as well to revitalize the mall's food court. However, these plans were shelved after the local government decided against moving offices to the mall, and in early 2003 Cardinale ended its immediate efforts to market the mall, choosing instead to keep the shopping center closed indefinitely.

In the years following, Cardinal and the county's licensing and inspection department fell into dispute about the mall's condition. The local government claimed that Cardinal had not properly maintained the mall property. Cardinal's property manager maintained that the mall had a full-time maintenance worker, and that a crew had repaired a leaky roof and cleaned mold out of the mall's interior.

The marshals’ substation moved out in the summer of 2004. All entrances to the parking lot were blocked off around 2010.

=== A cloudy future (1999–present) ===
Many ideas for the future of Regency Mall have been proposed over the last decade. Though the mall suffered from vandalism and exterior deterioration, it remained structurally sound. Cardinal Entities estimated the property's value at $30 to $40 million, but its property manager said there had been little interest in the property. There was a general consensus that Regency Mall would most likely never again operate as a major regional shopping center, and that it would either be adapted to new use or demolished to make way for another project.

One proposal for Regency Mall's reuse grew out of a series of public forums in 1999 and 2000. This plan would have redeveloped the mall into a combination of park and retail space arranged in a "village" streetscape format. The enclosed mall concourse would have been demolished, and the large anchor stores would have been reconfigured into shopping and office space with restyled facades. Other new buildings would have been constructed; the basin of Rocky Creek, walled into a concrete viaduct when the mall was built, would have been restored to a more natural appearance; and park and recreation space would have been made part of the site. This proposal, however, did not come to pass.

The Regency Mall property was also proposed as the site of a civic arena. However, Augusta-Richmond County voters defeated a local-option sales tax issue in 2004 that would have funded construction of a sports arena on the Regency Mall site.

In July 2006, Macedonia Baptist Church of Augusta announced that it had secured a lease-purchase agreement on the former Montgomery Ward building and 15 acres (61,000 m^{2}) of parking. The church revealed plans to turn the building into a sanctuary for up to 3,000 worshippers, a gymnasium, classrooms, a bookstore and a coffee shop. Pastor Dr. Gregory Fuller told the Augusta Chronicle that the church was in negotiations with the owners of the rest of the mall, and that "Our hope and aim is to possess the entire mall." However, the plan did not come to pass. In 2007, Cardinal purchased the Montgomery Ward property, thereby completing its purchase of the entire mall.

The future of Regency Mall has been a frequent issue in Augusta-Richmond County elections. Helen Blocker-Adams, a 2006 candidate for Georgia House District 120 against incumbent Quincy Murphy, made the revitalization of Regency Mall the centerpiece of her campaign. In December 2008, Augusta-Richmond County made a proposal to use $8 million from the next phase of Augusta's Special Purpose Local Option Sales Tax (SPLOST) to demolish the mall and clear the property for development. Tax dollars would be used only for demolition. More recently, the mall property's proximity to Rocky Creek, which lies in a "priority corridor" of the Augusta master plan, has prompted efforts by local officials to seek the property's redevelopment.

In June 2011, a team of county inspectors, in an effort to determine if Regency Mall was in violation of Augusta-Richmond County's abandoned properties ordinance, surveyed the mall's interior and found damage from vandalism, but no mold. Despite the county's desire to redevelop the property, Cardinal continued to market Regency Mall at a price of $52.5 million; though the company reported several firms have expressed interest, no buyer had yet surfaced.

In August 2012, WRDW-TV reported on small fires being set on the mall's property. A reporter and cameraman from the television station broke into the mall to shoot footage, and did this to display how easy it was to get inside the abandoned shopping center.

As of December 2013, in order to prevent any further vandalism and fires set by homeless people, transients, and squatters breaking into the mall, the City of Augusta and Richmond County officials ordered the mall's owner to either secure the facility in order to bring it up to 2013-2014 Richmond County and City of Augusta fire codes or demolish it. As a result, Regency Mall's entire mall interior along with the interiors of its five anchor store buildings were all completely gutted of all combustible materials, along with the removal of all mechanical and electrical equipment, wiring and systems, pluming fixtures, pipes, interior walls and doors, store fronts and gates, elevator cars, motors, hydraulics, escalators, HVAC unit systems, boilers, pumps, emergency generators, and electronic equipment, all of which left Regency Mall sitting as an empty shell with nothing but the internal concrete and steel skeletal structure resulting in extremely large wide open spaces inside. Some Urban Explorers who have managed to venture into the facility since the demolition of the interior of both the mall and anchor stores have posted videos on YouTube and posted photos on dead and abandoned mall websites showing just how far and extensive the interior demolition of the entire facility went. All of the outside entrances to the five anchor stores and to the actual mall sections have been cinder-blocked off and the entire building as a whole is being offered for lease with demolition also being offered as an option for possible property and surrounding land and area redevelopment.

In August 2017, it was announced that the property was among five locations under consideration for the new James Brown Arena. As of December 2017, a deal had yet to be struck and negotiations were ongoing. In early 2018, unauthorized demolition of the Regency Mall parking lot by the owners was stopped by the city of Augusta.

In October 2020, the Montgomery Ward anchor building was demolished. It is currently unknown what will replace Regency Mall.

== See also ==
- Augusta Mall
- Dead mall
- Fort Discovery — site of short-lived "Shoppes at Port Royal" mall, circa 1990
