= Augusta Mall =

Shopping mall in Augusta, Georgia

Coordinates: 33.46364°N 82.07939°W

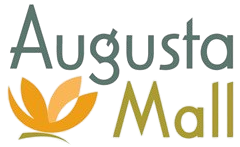

- Augusta Mall entrance
- Location: Augusta, Georgia, United States
- Opened: August 3, 1978; 48 years ago
- Developer: The Rouse Company
- Manager: GGP
- Owner: GGP
- Num. of stores: 149
- Num. of anchor tenants: 6
- Floor area: 1,099,224 sq ft (102,121.3 m^{2})
- Floors: 2
- Parking: 5,400 spaces
- Website: www.augustamall.com

Augusta Mall is a two-level super-regional shopping mall in Augusta, Georgia, United States. It is one of the largest malls in the state of Georgia, and it is the largest mall in the Augusta metropolitan area. The anchor stores are Dick's Sporting Goods, JCPenney, Dillard's, Macy's, Barnes & Noble, and Primark.

== History ==
Augusta Mall opened on August 3, 1978, one week after the now-defunct Regency Mall opened. Augusta Mall had about 90 retail spaces when it first opened, anchored by two department stores: Rich's and Davison's. Many of the mall's design features were borrowed from other successful malls developed by The Rouse Company. The space frame ceiling is a replica of The Mall in Columbia, Governor's Square, Tampa Bay Center and Hulen Mall while the center fountain and elevator was taken from Beachwood Place, which opened the same month as Augusta.

Since its opening, the mall has undergone 5 major expansions and several smaller renovations. The first of these began in 1987, when the mall added a 132,000-square-foot expansion for a new location of J. C. Penney.

In 1990, the mall underwent its second expansion, when Sears joined as the fourth anchor, in a 157,000-square-foot store. The $32 million renovation project also updated the interior of the mall and expanded the number of retail spaces from about 100 to more than 130.

In October 1992, Vice President of the United States Dan Quayle held a rally at the mall during the final stretch of the campaign before the 1992 United States presidential election. Over 5,000 supporters showed up, well above expectation for 1,000 attendants.

By 1998, when the third expansion was announced, Augusta Mall had become the region’s prime shopping area. J. B. White closed its store at Regency Mall and relocated to Augusta Mall to become its fifth anchor store, now Dillard's. Traffic congestion became a problem on Wrightsboro Road and Interstate 520 - the main freeway connecting the mall. The city funded a $231,000 project for expanded lanes as well as road improvements and new exit ramps to the mall.

In 2002, the Augusta Mall infrastructure was upgraded, including: storm drain maintenance, a new parking lot, and other interior work. Macy's closed during this time, and its lower level was converted into a furniture store.

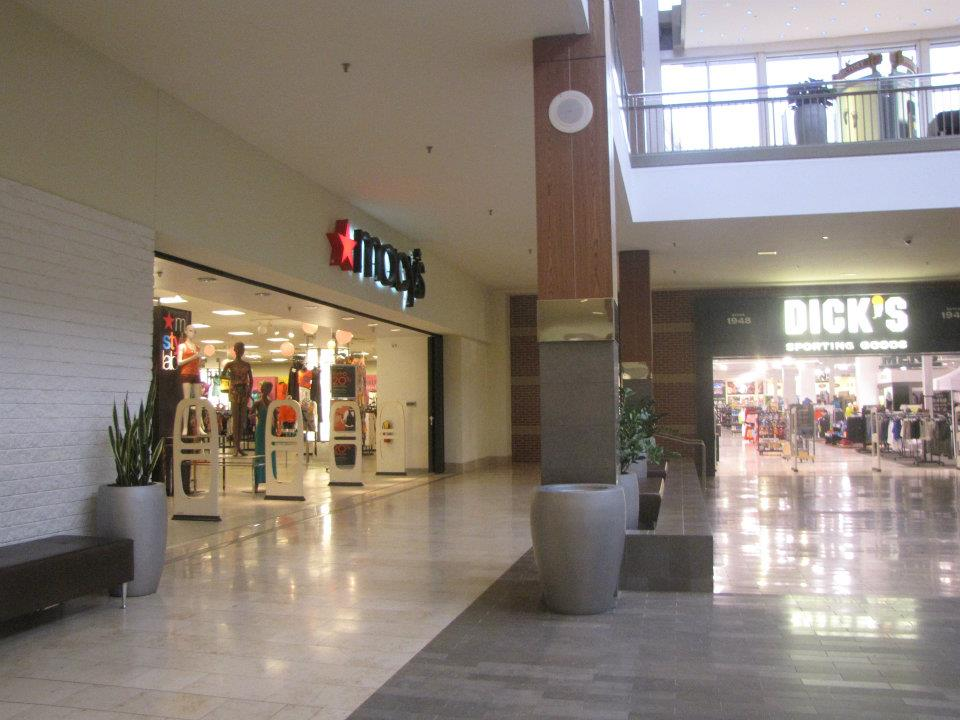
Former Davison's-converted Macy's was partly destroyed to make way for the Promenade as well as Dick's Sporting Goods and Macy's.

In 2006, a fourth expansion, “The Augusta Promenade”, a 180,000 sq ft (17,000 m^{2}) lifestyle center addition to the mall was announced. Construction of the development started in the summer of 2006, with the grand opening on November 8, 2007.

In 2007, a man drove his car into the mall.

In January 2013, Abercrombie & Fitch closed its location at the mall.

In July 2014, a thief stole $2,000 worth of panties from the Victoria's Secret store at the mall.

In January 2016, Vans, Torrid, and rue21 announced plans to open locations at the mall. In January 2017, Buca di Beppo, which had opened in February 2012, closed its location at the mall.

In April 2017, several men robbed the Apple Inc. store at the mall.

In April 2018, Williams Sonoma closed its location at the mall. Also that month, the mall began to be powered by a 435-kilowatt rooftop solar panel system. In September 2018, QC Nails Salon announced plans to open a 4,500 square foot location at the mall. On February 8, 2020, it was announced that Sears would be closing as part of a plan to close 39 stores nationwide. The store closed in April 2020.

On October 3, 2020, after an altercation, a gun was pulled out and two people were shot. One victim was transported to a nearby hospital where he later died from his wounds. The other victim was shot in the leg and she is expected to make a full recovery. On June 12, 2022, a gun was brandished during a verbal dispute in the mall's food court. No shots were fired. On April 28, 2024, a man was injured in a shooting in Dillard's at the mall. On July 4, 2024, a man was injured in a shooting.

In 2025, Primark announced that they were going to open on the upper level of the vacant Sears. Construction of the new 28,000 square foot (2601.3 m²) store began in 2025 and the store announced an opening date of September 10, 2026, but that date was pushed and Primark opened instead September 24, 2026. The store is the second Primark to open in Georgia.

On September 23, 2025, a 17-year old male was shot after an escalated fight and later died from his injury. Local authorities evacuated and closed the mall. At least six individuals were involved, with two in custody. This is the fifth in a recent series of gun-related incidents to occur at the mall.

== See also ==
- Regency Mall (Augusta, Georgia)
- List of shopping malls in the United States

== Gallery ==
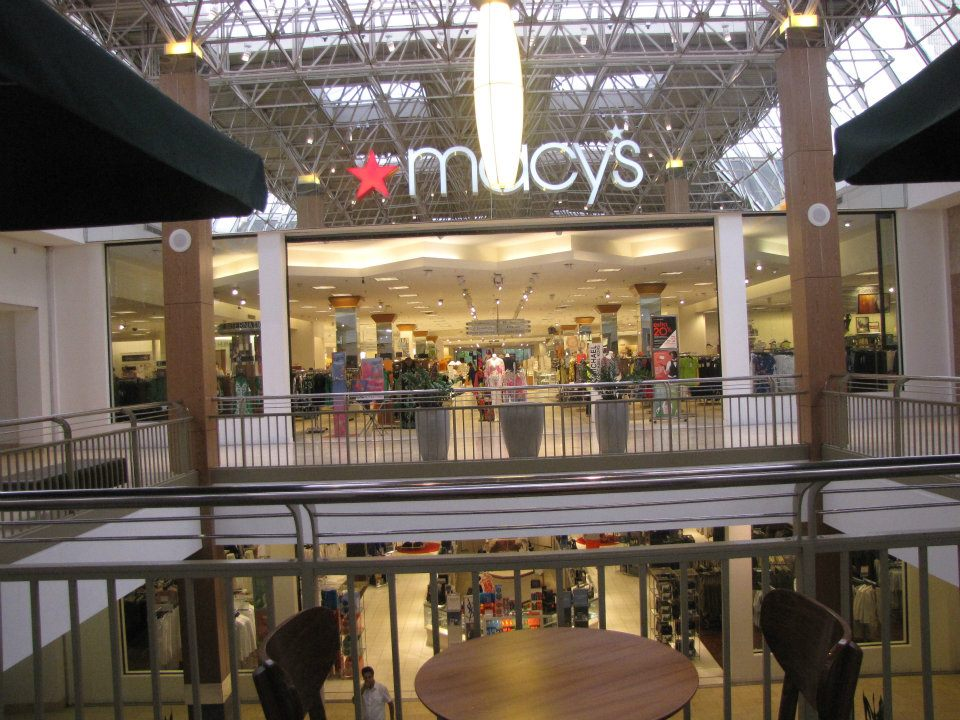
Interior entrance to Macy's in the Augusta Mall. This was formerly Rich's.

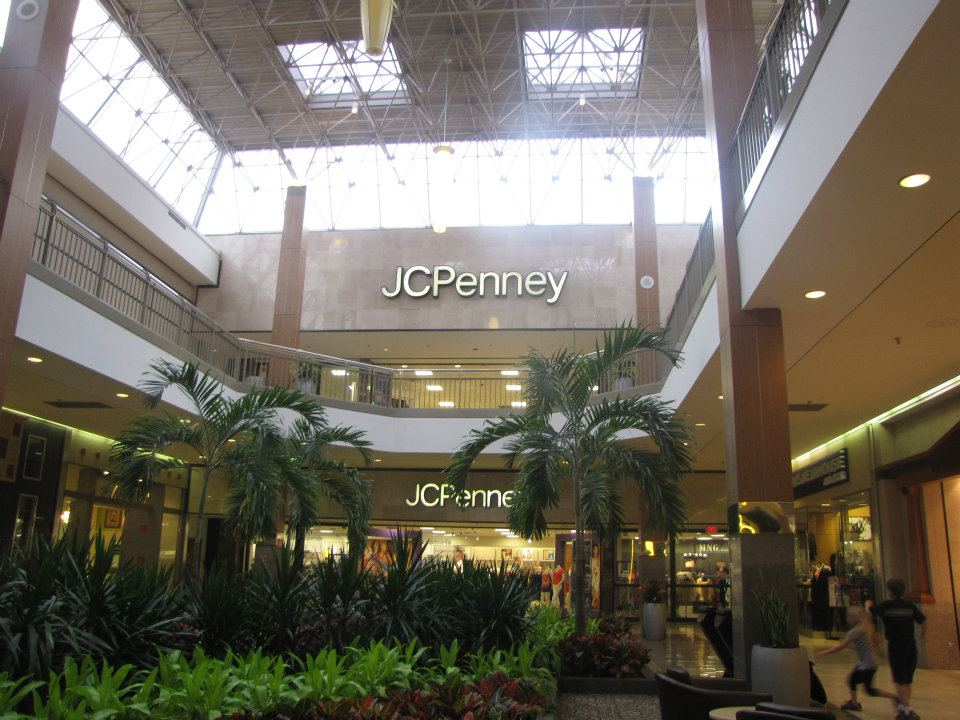
Interior entrance to JCPenney in the Augusta Mall

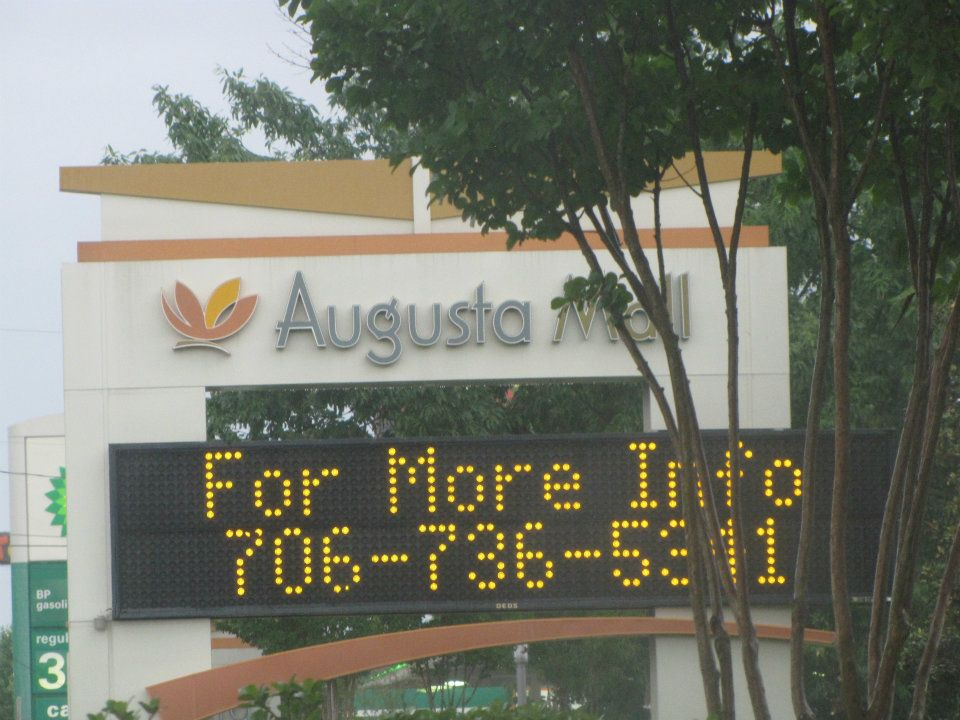
Sign off Wrightsboro Road in Augusta, Georgia for the Augusta Mall.

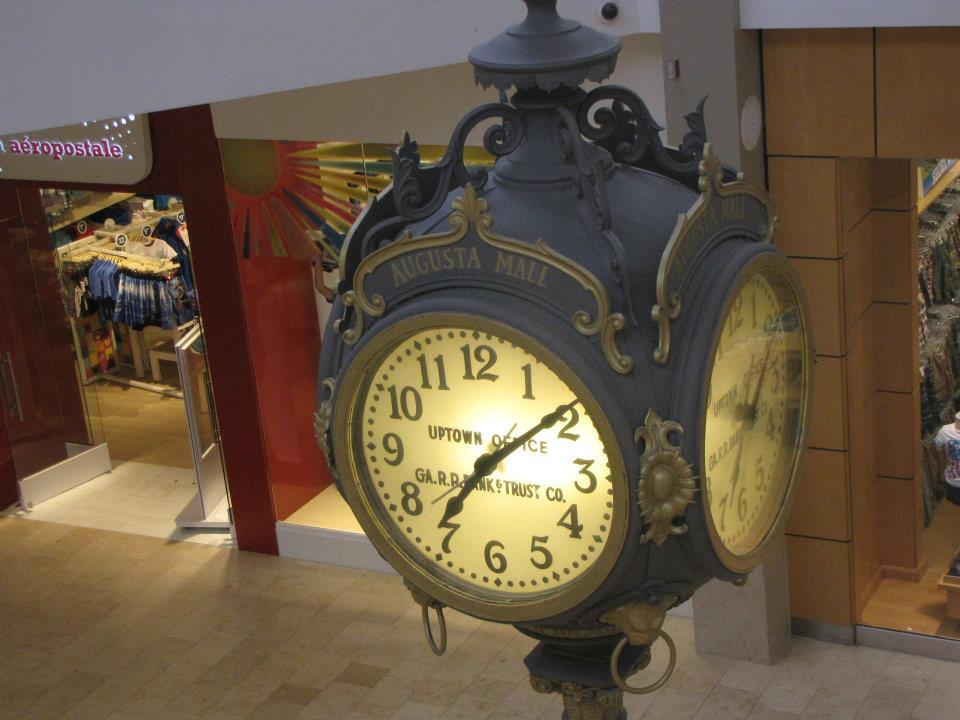
Clock in the center of Augusta Mall
