= Cape Fear Club =

Gentlemen's club in North Carolina, US

The Cape Fear Club
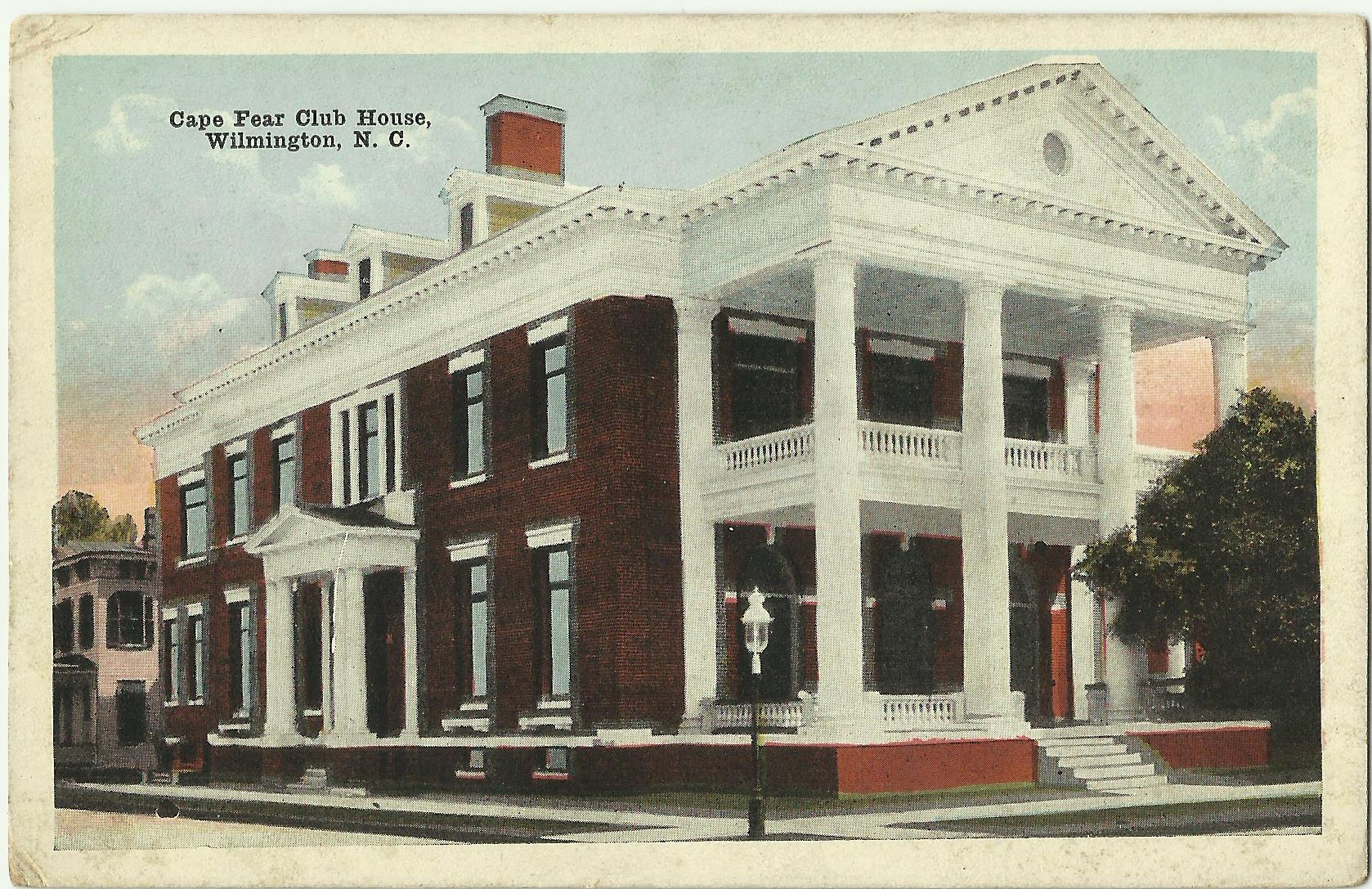
- The Cape Fear Club
- Founded: 1866; 160 years ago
- Location: 206 Chestnut St, Wilmington, NC

Cape Fear Club is a private gentlemen's club in Wilmington, North Carolina, founded in 1866, making it the 6th oldest in the Southern United States after the Metropolitan Club and before The Oglethorpe Club. It is described as "a business and professional men's club" that was founded in 1866 by former Confederate soldiers and incorporated in 1872 by the General Assembly.

The club played an important role in the Wilmington massacre in 1898, and was fictionalized in Philip Gerard's novel about the insurrection called Cape Fear Rising.

In 1892, the club purchased and moved into John Dawson Jr.'s house.

The club owns paintings by Giovanni Battista Moroni, Pietro Liberi, and Guido Cagnacci.

The club has served as a filming location. The club is a gentleman's only establishment that has been tied to high-profile events in Wilmington, North Carolina, in some cases related to the city's fraught racial history. and in other cases related to its prominence in modern politics and controversial political decisions.

Recently, a highly-profitable concert series was canceled based on concerns, according to Community Services Director Amy Beatty, that “the noise created by a concert would reasonably cause negative conflicts with events taking place in the Cape Fear Men’s Club (CFC) and potentially Thalian Hall.”

It is governed under laws for 501(c)(7) Social and Recreation Clubs; in 2024, it claimed total revenue of $1,223,832 and total assets of $2,389,046.
