= Christian Sottile =

American architect

Christian Sottile is an American architect and urban designer who is professor at the Savannah College of Art and Design. He is the principal of Sottile & Sottile, an urban design and architectural firm based in Savannah, Georgia. Sottile's work focuses on civic design and master planning, urban analysis, and community-wide engagement with an emphasis on historic research.

== Education ==
In 1997, Sottile earned a bachelor's degree and Master of Architecture degree from the School of Building Arts at the SCAD. He trained under the guidance of renowned master architect John C. Lebey, FAIA. He then spent two years in Florence researching urban design before completing his Master's of Architecture and Urban Design at Syracuse University in 1999.

== Career ==
In 1999, Sottile became professor of architecture and urban design at the Savannah College of Art and Design. In 2011, he was named the dean of the School of Building Arts at the SCAD and served in that role until 2017.

== Awards ==
Sottile has also received more than 50 awards for his work, including three international Charter Awards from the Congress for the New Urbanism, awards from the American Planning Association, the National Trust for Historic Preservation, and three National Honor Awards from the AIA. In addition, USA Today named him one of the top 100 academics in the nation. He is a member of the National Council of Architectural Registration Boards (NCARB).

Sottile's work has been featured in The New York Times, Preservation Magazine, Architect Magazine, and Architectural Digest.

- 2023: elected a Fellow of the American Institute of Architects
- 2014: National Young Architect Award from the American Institute of Architects
- 2021: Global Award for Excellence from the Urban Land Institute.
