= Savannah Mall =

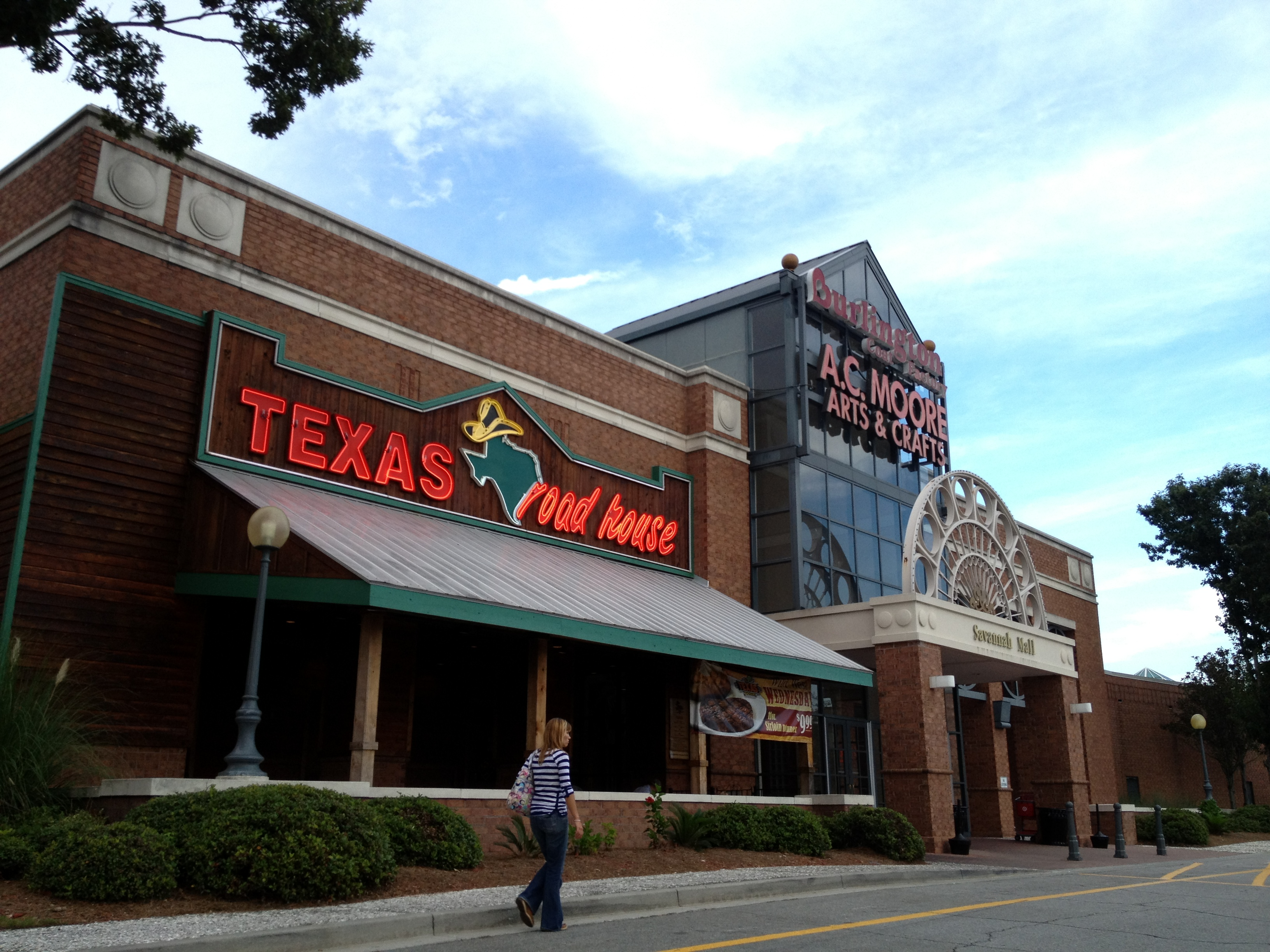
- Entrance to Savannah Mall, September 2012
- Location: Savannah, Georgia, United States
- Coordinates: 31.98384°N 81.17191°W
- Opened: August 29, 1990; 36 years ago
- Closed: February 2023
- Developer: Hocker and Associates, Inc. and R.F. Coffin Enterprises, Inc.
- Owner: BCHM Investment Group
- Num. of stores: 110
- Num. of anchor tenants: 5 (3 open, 2 vacant)
- Floor area: 962,529 sq ft (89,421.9 m^{2}) (GLA)
- Floors: 2
- Parking: 3,783 spaces
- Website: savannahmall.com

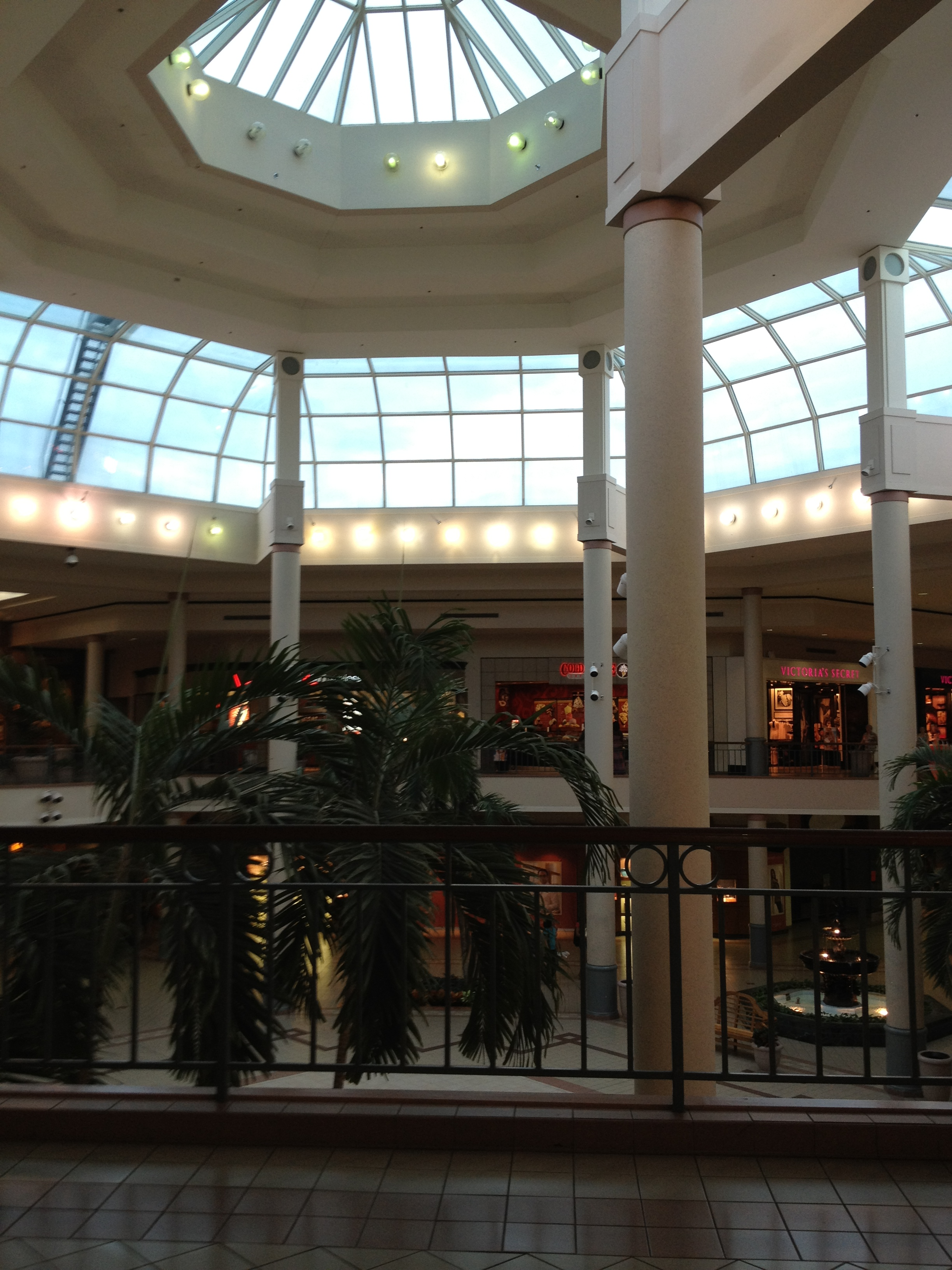
Interior view of Savannah Mall, September 2012

Savannah Mall is a defunct two-level enclosed regional shopping mall on the southside of Savannah, Georgia, that opened August 29, 1990. The mall is anchored by Target, Bass Pro Shops, and Dillard's. The lower level of the anchor pad that is occupied by Target is a former Burlington Coat Factory that closed in 2020 and currently occupied by an e-cigarette and hemp products distributor. The upper level of an original Montgomery Ward is currently occupied by the Savannah Bananas. The lower level is currently a call center.

== History ==
The land the mall sits on was originally subdivided in the 1940s as Forest River Farms (named for the nearby river) and was a swampy lowland of nearly 80 acres. It was proposed to be a residential subdivision in then-rural, unincorporated Chatham County. This never came to fruition.

In the 1970s, Abercorn Expressway (Georgia State Route 204) was extended down to Interstate 95. Subdivisions were being built nearby and by the mid 1980s, the only remaining tract of land was the Forest River Farms subdivision. By 1988 the land had been rezoned commercial and a development plan for the Savannah Mall was approved by the Metropolitan Planning Commission. Real Estate developers David Hocker Associates and R.F. Coffin Enterprises began construction in early 1989. The architect was Birmingham, Alabama based Crawford, McWilliams, Hatcher Associates, Inc. Civil engineering and Land Surveying were provided locally by EMC Engineering.

When Savannah Mall opened on August 29, 1990, it was expected to supplant Savannah's older Oglethorpe Mall. Savannah Mall was considered upscale and featured stores exclusive to the market like Abercrombie & Fitch, Ann Taylor, Banana Republic, United Colors of Benetton, Blockbuster Music and The Disney Store. It also contained many duplicate stores already found in Oglethorpe Mall such as GAP, The Limited, Lerner Shops, Waldenbooks, Spencer's Gifts, and other common mall shops in that era.

Belk, J.B. White, Miller & Rhoads, and Jordan Marsh were the planned original anchors. Belk (the third in Savannah at the time) and J.B. White opened with the mall in August 1990. Miller & Rhoads filed for bankruptcy during the mall's construction, and subsequently went out of business before ever opening. Jordan Marsh already operated a store at Oglethorpe Mall and scrapped plans for a new store when parent company Allied Stores filed for bankruptcy in 1990. Parisian and Montgomery Ward backfilled Miller & Rhoads and Jordan Marsh respectively. They opened in 1991.

The area around the mall also began to develop. In 1990, construction began across the street from Savannah Mall on the very first Publix outside the state of Florida. Kroger and Wal-Mart were also developed by David Hocker across Abercorn Expressway and opened in 1991.

Montgomery Ward pulled out of the mall in 1998. Later that year Dillard's acquired J.B. White parent company Mercantile Stores Company, Inc. and rebranded the store. Parisian and Belk both left the mall in early 2003. At this point, many stores were leaving the mall and by 2005, there were more than 20 vacancies, with some stores relocating to Oglethorpe Mall, and others exiting the Savannah market altogether.

In August 2003, Bass Pro Shops opened in the space vacated by Parisian. Target opened its first Savannah area store in the mall in October 2004. Target demolished the Belk building to construct a new 213,735-square-foot (19,856.6 m^{2}) building. Target occupies the second level, and Burlington Coat Factory took the ground floor in 2006 and remained in this location until relocating across town in 2020. Steve & Barry's opened in 2004 in the former Montgomery Ward, and closed in 2009. A.C. Moore opened as a junior anchor in 2007 and lasted until 2019.

In 2008, the mall's owners undertook multimillion-dollar renovations with improvements focused on energy conservation, lighting and additional ADA access. The mall also received a new logo and modern features like Wi-Fi.

Kohan Retail Investment Group purchased the mall in September 2016. Savannah Mall was sold at auction to BCHM Investment Group for eight million dollars in October 2022. The mall at the time of sale had air conditioning and escalator issues.

In December 2022, it was reported that the mall’s new owners were asking remaining tenants to vacate. The mall was scheduled to close on January 12, 2023 with all of the anchors remaining open. Despite these announcements, the alderman of Savannah, Georgia announced on January 12 that the mall would not be closing. As of March 2023, the doors to the mall (except the anchors) are locked and the in-line mall appears closed.

== List of anchor stores ==
Name	No. of floors	Year opened	Year closed	Notes
Bass Pro Shops	2	2003	—N/a	Replaced Parisian
Belk	2	1990	2003	
Burlington Coat Factory	1	2006	2020	Replaced Belk
Dillard's	2 + Mezzanine	1998	—N/a	Replaced J.B. White
J.B. White	2 + Mezzanine	1990	1998	
Jordan Marsh	2	Never		Planned for Opening
Miller & Rhoads	2	Never		Planned for Opening, Cancelled due to Bankruptcy
Montgomery Ward	2	1991	1998	
Parisian	2	1991	2003	
Steve & Barry's	1	2004	2009	Replaced Montgomery Ward
Target	1	2004	—N/a	Replaced Belk
