= Gwinnett–McIntosh duel =

1777 duel between Button Gwinnett and Lachlan McIntosh

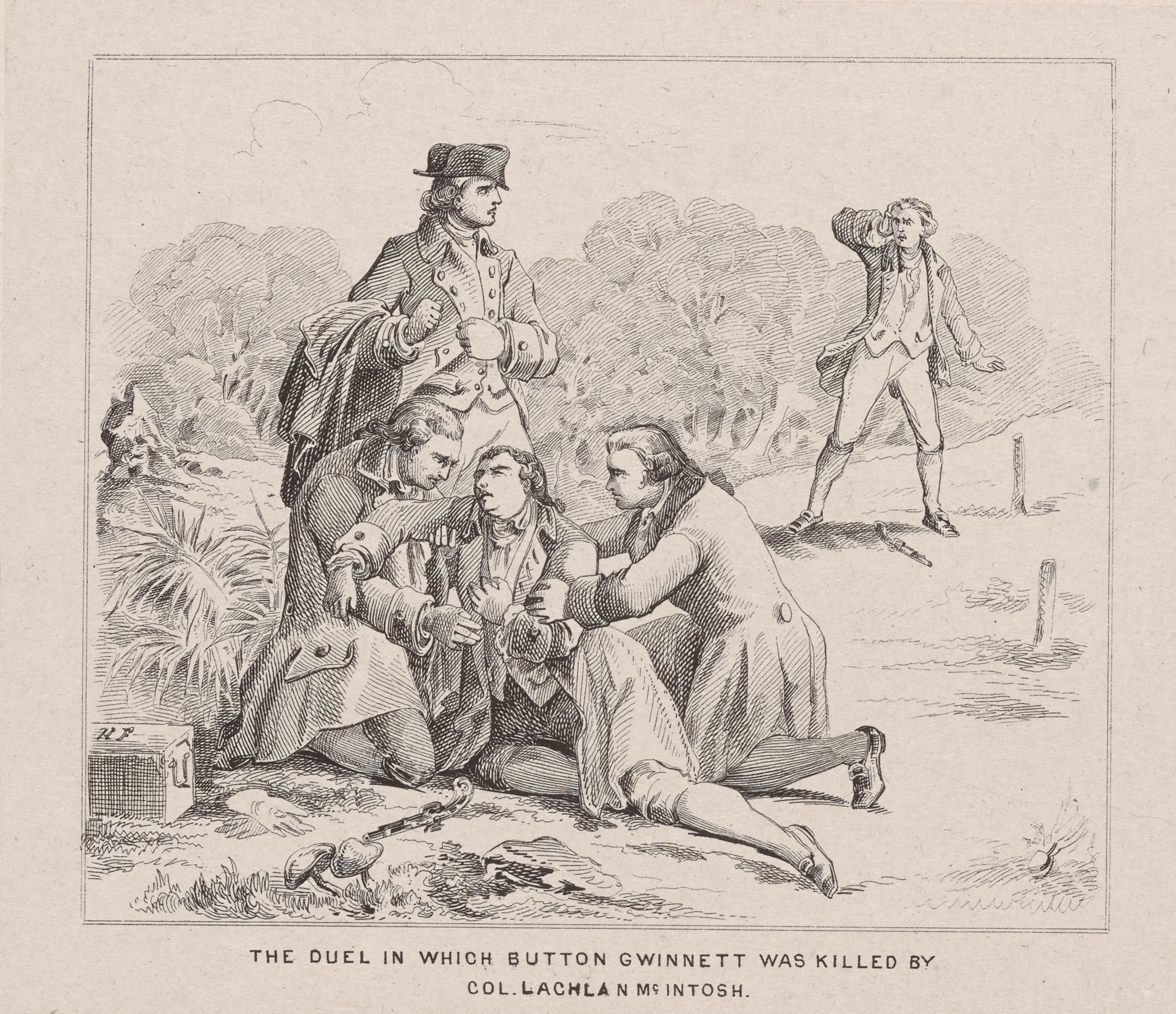
- An 1865 illustration showing the immediate aftermath of the duel
- Date: May 16, 1777
- Location: Near Colonial Park Cemetery, Savannah, Georgia, United States
- Type: Duel
- Participants: Button Gwinnett; Lachlan McIntosh
- Deaths: 1 (Gwinnett)
- Charges: McIntosh: Murder (acquitted)

The Gwinnett–McIntosh duel was a pistol duel between Button Gwinnett, a signer of the United States Declaration of Independence and former governor of Georgia, and Lachlan McIntosh, a brigadier general in the Continental Army, that took place on May 16, 1777, in Savannah, Georgia. The duel resulted in both men suffering gunshot wounds, with Gwinnett dying of his wounds several days later.

The cause of the duel stemmed from a rivalry that had developed between the two individuals in the preceding years. During the American Revolution, both Gwinnett and McIntosh were Whigs. However, Gwinnett was a leader of the more radical faction of Whigs in Georgia, while McIntosh was a political conservative. In early 1776, the state's Provincial Congress elected Gwinnett to lead a battalion of Continental Army troops in the state, though Gwinnett ultimately turned down the position, due in large part to the divisiveness between the radical and conservative factions. Instead, McIntosh was elected, while Gwinnett was selected to attend the Second Continental Congress, where he signed the Declaration of Independence. Upon returning to Georgia in late 1776, Gwinnett again served as the radical Whigs' leader, helping to write a new constitution for the state and serving for a brief time as the state's governor. In this role, he was also the commander-in-chief of the state's military, and in this position, he led an invasion of East Florida, a British colony that bordered the state. McIntosh and other conservatives were opposed to the military action, viewing it as a politically motivated endeavor by Gwinnett to increase his political standing. The invasion ended in disaster, and in subsequent hearings before the Georgia General Assembly, McIntosh attacked Gwinnett as a "scoundrel and a lying rascal". Feeling dishonored, Gwinnett then challenged McIntosh to a duel, which McIntosh accepted.

The duel took place on the morning of May 16, 1777, near the city's Colonial Park Cemetery. Both individuals fired their shots roughly simultaneously, with both getting hit in their legs. Gwinnett's injuries caused him to collapse, and while he accepted an offer from McIntosh to continue their duel, their seconds intervened and ended the dispute. While McIntosh recovered from his injury, Gwinnett did not, and he died several days later on May 19. A trial took place, with McIntosh accused of murder, though he was ultimately acquitted. However, the duel and Gwinnett's death damaged his reputation in Georgia, and he was soon relocated elsewhere. The duel is considered one of the most famous in the state's history, coming during a time when dueling was a much more common occurrence. Partially as a result of his death, which occurred less than a year after his signing the Declaration of Independence, Gwinnett's signature is considered one of the rarest of any of the signers.

== Background ==
=== Debate over military appointment ===
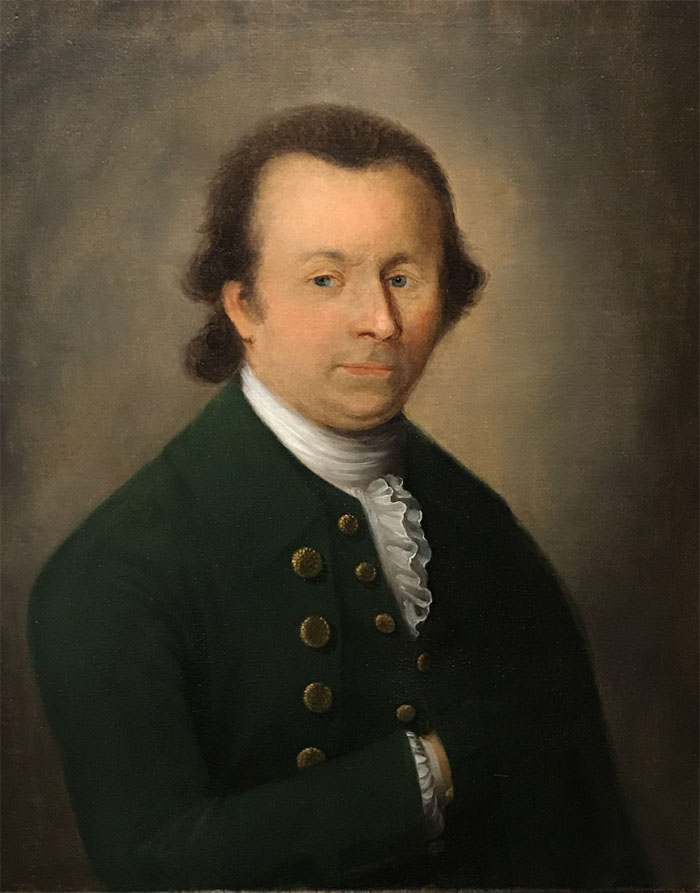
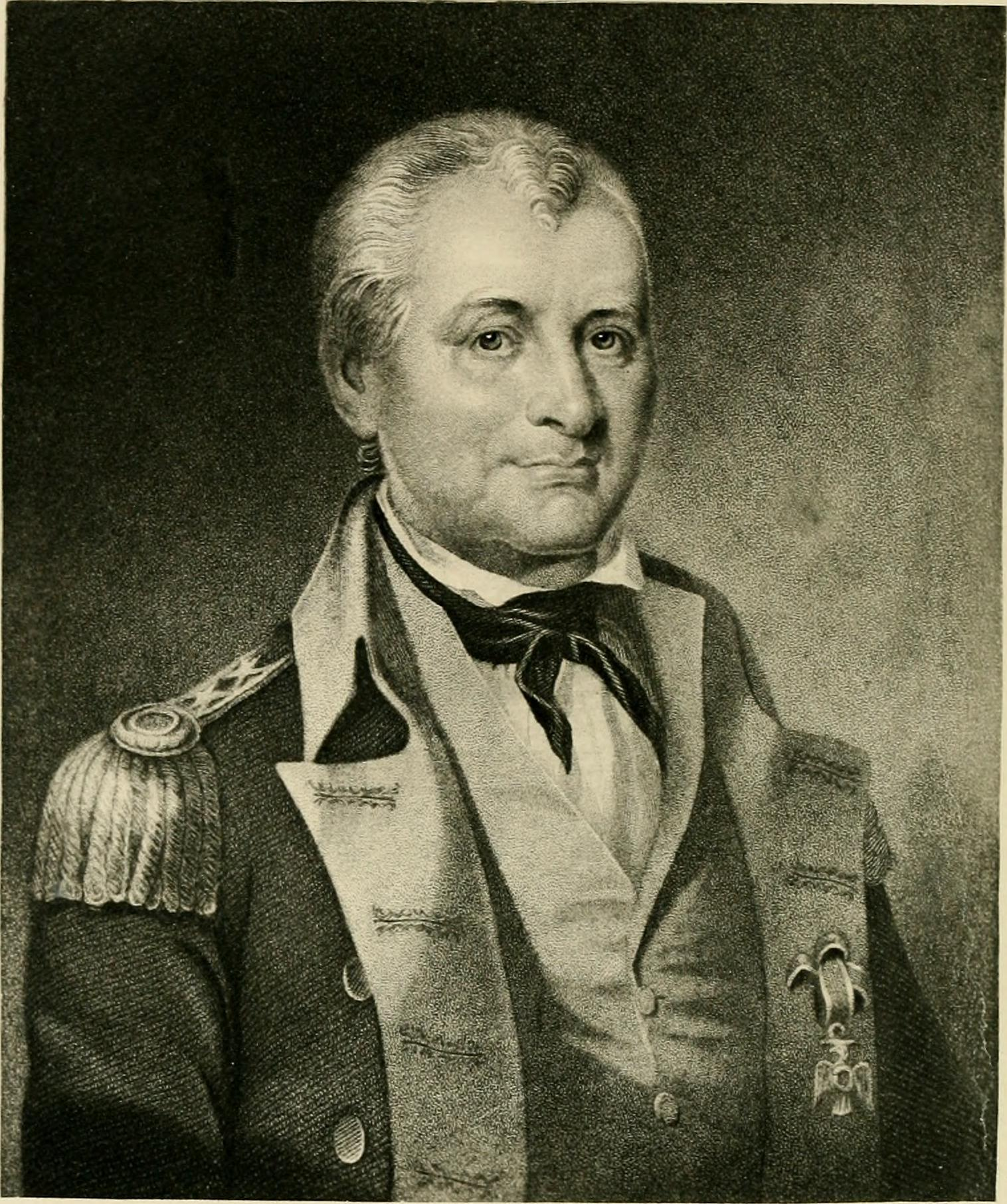
Button Gwinnett (left) and Lachlan McIntosh

In January 1776, amidst the American Revolutionary War, four British warships were stationed near Cockspur Island at the mouth of the Savannah River, downstream of the port city of Savannah, Georgia. Pro-Revolutionary Whigs in the local Council of Safety, led by George Walton, quickly took action, placing Governor James Wright and other royal officials under arrest and directing one-third of the members of the Georgia Militia to prepare for the defense of the city. In addition, Georgia's Provincial Congress made plans to create a battalion of Continental Army troops to assist the militia, as the Second Continental Congress had authorized a force of 728 men to defend Georgia.

However, the Provincial Congress struggled to elect leaders for this new battalion due to conflicts between the Political factions of conservative and radical Whigs. The conservative faction was made up primarily of politicians from the Christ Church Parish, which included Savannah. For commanding officer, the conservatives, who largely controlled the Provincial Congress, nominated Samuel Elbert, who had previously been named by the Council of Safety as the colonel of the militia defense force. In contrast, St. John's Parish, which included the community of Sunbury, was much more radical. By early 1776, Button Gwinnett had emerged as a leader of this faction, having inherited the role from Lyman Hall after the latter departed to Philadelphia to attend the Second Continental Congress.

Gwinnett had been a merchant in Savannah and, later, a planter in St. John's Parish. He successfully united residents of the coastal and rural parts of Georgia, primarily in the western and southern parishes, into this radical movement, and they nominated him in opposition to Elbert. While Gwinnett won the election, he declined to serve, acknowledging the divisiveness within the Provincial Congress, and instead Lachlan McIntosh, a conservative Whig and planter from Darien in St. Andrew's Parish, was selected as a compromise candidate, becoming the battalion's colonel. In exchange, many of the officer positions below the rank of major were awarded to radical Whigs, while Gwinnett was selected to attend the Second Continental Congress as a representative of Georgia. Despite the compromise, contention remained between the conservative and radical forces in the state's politics, with Joseph Habersham, who had just been appointed a major under McIntosh, corresponding to a friend in February,

this province is remarkable for a number of parties and I am afraid ... that a house divided against itself can never stand

=== Developments through 1777 ===
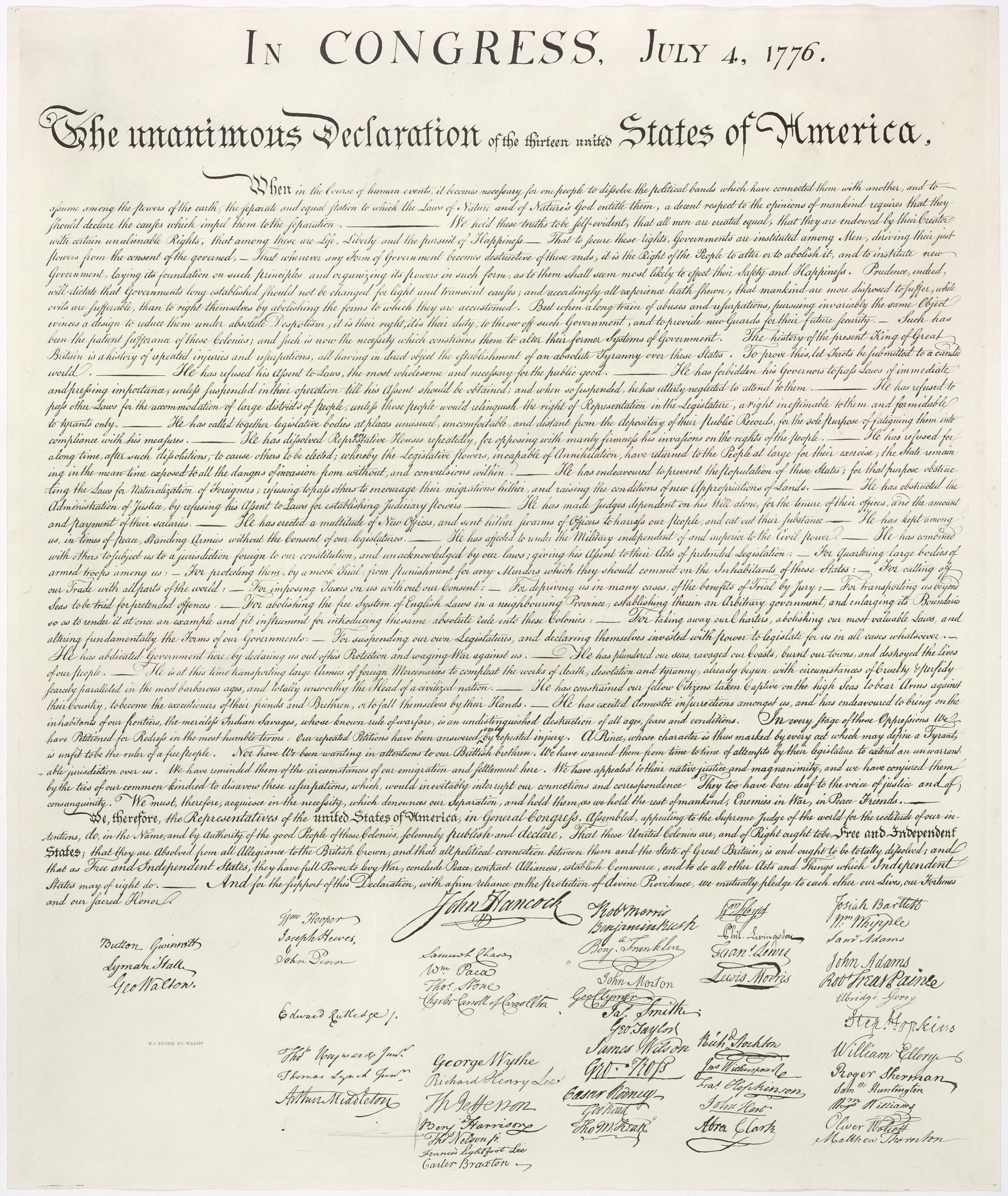
In this 1823 copy of the United States Declaration of Independence, Gwinnett's signature is the first on the left.

Shortly after his appointment, McIntosh began establishing additional defenses for Savannah, and in March, he led Whig forces against the British in the Battle of the Rice Boats, which was the first major battle of the American Revolutionary War fought in Georgia. In early August, he led American troops through southern Georgia and into East Florida, terrorizing loyalists and causing many to flee to St. Augustine. In late August, McIntosh led a campaign that sought to attack St. Augustine, but the venture was soon abandoned due to poor planning. In the meantime, Gwinnett, who was in Philadelphia as a member of the Continental Congress, pressed for a full political separation of the Thirteen Colonies from Great Britain, and to that effect, he voted in favor of independence. In August, he became a signer of the United States Declaration of Independence, alongside fellow Georgians Hall and Walton. He returned to Georgia later that month.

By September, the accord that had previously been sustained between the radical and conservative Whig factions had disintegrated, due in part to a contentious Provincial Congress election that month. The radical faction secured a majority in the legislature. His supporters elected him speaker of this body, and he was influential in creating a new Constitution of Georgia, which was approved in February 1777. In mid-February, when the Provincial Congress adjourned, the Council of Safety became the state's governing body. Radical Whigs also gained control of this body, and when Archibald Bulloch, the President of Georgia, died that same month, the Council of Safety voted for Gwinnett to take over this vacancy, which also granted him the position of commander-in-chief of the state's military. By this time, McIntosh had been promoted to the rank of brigadier general, a position which Gwinnett had sought after upon his return to Georgia.

=== Gwinnett's invasion of Florida ===
On the same day that Gwinnett was elected commander-in-chief, the Georgia Executive Council passed an act requesting Gwinnett to lead a military expedition south into Florida to claim the British colony for the United States. At the time, a contingent of several hundred British soldiers were threatening the state's southern border, having recently overtaken Fort McIntosh and requiring McIntosh to establish a defense line along the Altamaha River. On March 4, the Council of Safety voted to allow Gwinnett to lead an expedition. with the Executive Council serving as his council of war.

Along with securing the state's territory, Gwinnett saw a successful military invasion as a way to heighten his political power. However, McIntosh and his brother George were both largely opposed to the expedition, considering it a politically motivated endeavor. Gwinnett sought Continental soldiers from Robert Howe, the commander of the Continental Army's Southern Department, and perhaps seeking to reduce McIntosh's influence in the state, requested that McIntosh be reassigned to another area of the country. However, Howe advised Gwinnett against his planned invasion and did not relocate McIntosh. Around the same time, acting in part on advice from the Continental Congress, Gwinnett had George arrested on charges of treason. Additionally, Gwinnett launched a witch hunt against conservatives in the state, in part accusing some of them of working for British interests in Florida as a justification for his planned invasion. On March 17, Gwinnett presented his invasion plan to Howe, though he rejected it and shortly thereafter returned from Savannah to Charleston, South Carolina. Undeterred, Gwinnett led a group of militia members southwards and requested that McIntosh join him on his expedition. However, not long after leaving Savannah, the march stalled, and the Council of Safety requested that Elbert lead the expedition. Both Gwinnett and McIntosh hesitantly agreed to this, though Elbert's invasion, much like the previous ventures, ended in failure for the Georgians.

In May, the Georgia General Assembly convened for the first time under the new constitution. During the meeting, John A. Treutlen, a political moderate, was elected by the Assembly as the state's governor, replacing Gwinnett as the state's chief executive. According to historian Don Carlos Seitz, McIntosh may have played a role in Gwinnett's electoral defeat. Additionally, they launched an investigation into the disaster in Florida, reviewing both Gwinnett and McIntosh's conduct. The legislature was again divided along faction lines, with conservatives pinning the blame on Gwinnett and radicals putting McIntosh at fault. At an assembly meeting on May 15, 1777, McIntosh publicly denounced Gwinnett and ridiculed his leadership. With Gwinnett present, McIntosh called him a "scoundrel and a lying rascal". Gwinnett, outraged, challenged McIntosh to a duel, sending him a written challenge later that evening, which he accepted.

== Duel ==
The day after Gwinnett had issued the challenge to McIntosh, the two men met on the morning of May 16. Gwinnett had requested that the duel take place before sunrise, on a pasture previously owned by Wright. According to historian Thomas Gamble, it is speculated that this location was directly south of the city's Colonial Park Cemetery. McIntosh and his second, Habersham, arrived prior to Gwinnett and his second, George Wells, and upon the latter's arrival, McIntosh provided the two with pistols that were loaded with a single bullet each. Following this, the two separated themselves by a distance of several paces. (Note: Sources differ on the distance between the two during the duel. A 1929 book by historian Don Carlos Seitz states that the two were separated by "twelve paces", while a 1923 book by historian Thomas Gamble gives the distance as "[f]our paces, or twelve feet". A 2019 entry in the New Georgia Encyclopedia also gives the distance as "twelve feet". Additionally, a 2003 book by historian Walter J. Fraser Jr. gives the distance as "four paces". In a contemporary report on the duel written by Lyman Hall, he said that the two were separated by a distance of "10 or 12" feet.) Both men fired their shots roughly simultaneously, with both getting hit by the bullets. McIntosh received a leg wound, while Gwinnett was shot in his thigh. Gwinnett's injury caused him to collapse. McIntosh asked Gwinnett if he wished to engage again in another volley of gunfire, which Gwinnett agreed to, if he could receive assistance in bringing him to his feet. However, both men's seconds intervened, declaring that both men's honor had been demonstrated, prompting Gwinnett and McIntosh to shake hands and end the duel.

== Aftermath ==
"Mr. Gwinnett was brought in, the Weather Extremely hot. A Mortification came on–he languish'd from that Morning (Friday) till Monday Morning following & expired.
O Liberty. Why do you suffer so many of your faithful sons, your warmest Votaries, to fall at your Shrine. Alas, my Friend, my Friend.
Excuse me, Dr. Sir, the man was VALUABLE, so attached to the Liberty of this State & Continent that his whole Attention, Influence & Interest centered in it, & seemed riveted to it. He left a Mournful Widow and Daugr. and I may say the Friends of Liberty on a whole Continent to deplore his Fall."

— Lyman Hall, in a letter written to Roger Sherman discussing the death of Gwinnett

Within a short time, McIntosh had recovered from his gunshot wound. However, Gwinnett's health did not improve following the duel, and he died of his wounds on May 19. He was presumably buried in Colonial Park Cemetery. (Note: There is some uncertainty as to the exact location of Gwinnett's burial, but historians largely agree that he was buried in Colonial Park Cemetery.) Hall, who had been a political ally and close friend of Gwinnett's, discussed the duel in a letter written shortly afterwards to Roger Sherman, a fellow signer of the Declaration of Independence.

Following the duel, Hall, among others, notified the General Assembly that the law enforcement officers in the city had taken no action in apprehending McIntosh for his role in the duel. Following this, McIntosh turned himself in, with Assistant Judge John Wereat conducting an inquest into the matter. Wells provided a full account of the duel as well. McIntosh, who was on trial for murder, had been shocked at Gwinnett's death and expressed regret over the duel as having brought "an unfortunate man to his own destruction". Ultimately, the trial resulted in McIntosh's acquittal, with the authorities finding him not guilty.

Despite the result of the trial, McIntosh's standing in Georgia had been ruined by the duel, and, acting on the advice of his friends, he sought a transfer to a military position in the Northern United States. In his stead, Elbert took control of the Continental forces in the state. McIntosh proceeded to serve directly under George Washington at Valley Forge. He was later promoted to commander of the Continental Army's Western Department. By the 1780s, McIntosh had returned to Georgia, where he remained for the rest of his life.

== Legacy ==
The New Georgia Encyclopedia refers to the Gwinnett–McIntosh duel as "[p]robably the state's most famous duel". Concerning the duel, Gamble wrote in 1923:

The duel between McIntosh and Gwinnett was the closing clash between two determined, impetuous, courageous men, both devoted to republican principles, but each also governed by personal impulses and ambitions and little inclined to mediate personal differences when they assumed the nature of a serious affront.

Over the next several years, dueling remained relatively common in Georgia, with the New Georgia Encyclopedia describing the state as a "hotbed" for dueling during the revolution. In 1780, Wells, Gwinnett's second, was killed in a duel of his own against James Jackson. Jackson would later become the governor of Georgia. In 1809, the state government officially outlawed the practice, though it would continue for the next several decades.

Partially as a result of Gwinnett's death, which occurred shortly after he signed the Declaration of Independence, his signature is among the rarest of all signers.

== See also ==
- Dueling in the Southern United States
- List of duels in the United States
- List of people killed in duels
- Political violence in the United States

== Sources ==
- Bennett, Charles E.; Lennon, Donald R. (1991). "Southern Politics and Continental Command". A Quest for Glory: Major General Robert Howe and the American Revolution. Chapel Hill, North Carolina: University of North Carolina Press. pp. 52–69. ISBN 978-0-8078-1982-1. OCLC 23144138.
- Callaway, Witt (February 13, 2019) [November 20, 2018]. "Dueling in Georgia". New Georgia Encyclopedia. Archived from the original on January 15, 2025.
- Cashin, Edward J. (September 30, 2020) [March 26, 2005]. "Revolutionary War in Georgia". New Georgia Encyclopedia. Archived from the original on January 15, 2025.
- Cook, James F. (1995). The Governors of Georgia, 1754–1995 (Revised and expanded ed.). Macon, Georgia: Mercer University Press. ISBN 978-0-86554-480-2. OCLC 32778781.
- Deaton, Stan (August 1, 2019) [January 23, 2004]. "Button Gwinnett". New Georgia Encyclopedia. Archived from the original on December 9, 2024.
- Drake, Ross (March 2004). "Duel!". Smithsonian. ISSN 0037-7333. OCLC 1359769. Archived from the original on January 16, 2025.
- Fraser, Walter J. Jr. (2003). Savannah in the Old South. Athens, Georgia: University of Georgia Press. ISBN 978-0-8203-2436-4. OCLC 49822933.
- Gamble, Thomas (1923). Savannah Duels and Duellists, 1733–1877. Savannah, Georgia: Review Publishing & Printing Company. OCLC 1450131.
- Seitz, Don C. (1929). Famous American Duels. New York City: Thomas Y. Crowell Co.
- Sullivan, Buddy (February 21, 2018) [September 12, 2002]. "Lachlan McIntosh". New Georgia Encyclopedia. Archived from the original on December 10, 2024.
