= Habersham =

Habersham is a surname and the name of geographical locations and may refer to:

== People ==
- James Habersham (1712–1775), British merchant, colonial official and advocate of slavery in the North American colony of Georgia
  - James Habersham Jr. (1745–1799), American merchant and Speaker of the Georgia General Assembly, son of James
  - John Habersham (1754–1799), American merchant, planter, politician and Continental Army officer, son of James
  - Joseph Habersham (1751–1815), American businessman, politician, Continental Army soldier and Postmaster General of the United States, son of James
- Joseph Clay Habersham (1790–1855), American physician
  - Joseph Clay Habersham Jr. (1829–1881), American physician, son of Joseph Clay Habersham Sr.
- Richard Parnell Habersham, American actor
- Richard W. Habersham (1786–1842), American lawyer and politician

== Places in the United States ==
- Habersham, Tennessee, an unincorporated community
- Habersham County, Georgia
