= List of people killed in duels =

This is a list of people killed in duels by date:

== 14th century ==
- Jacques le Gris, by Jean de Carrouges in a wooden arena outside the Abbey of Saint-Martin-des-Champs in Paris – 1386

== 16th century ==
- Cadeguala, Mapuche toqui, by Alonso García de Ramón at Purén, Chile – 1585
- Sir William Drury, English politician and soldier, by Sir John Borough, died from wound received in duel in France – 1590
- Gabriel Spenser, Elizabethan actor, by Ben Jonson on Hoxton Fields, London – 1598

== 17th century ==
- Ranuccio Tomassoni by Caravaggio, 1606.
- Sir John Townshend, English politician, by Sir Matthew Browne on Hounslow Heath, London – 1603. Browne himself was killed on the spot by Townshend, who in turn died of his wounds the following day.
- Peter Legh, English politician, by Valentine Browne – 1640
- Armand d'Athos, inspiration for the Alexandre Dumas character of the same name – 1643
- Charles Price, English politician, by Capt. Robert Sandys at Presteigne – 1645
- Sir Henry Bellasis (heir of John Belasyse, 1st Baron Belasyse), by Thomas Porter (dramatist) at Covent Garden, London – 1667
- Francis Talbot, 11th Earl of Shrewsbury, by the Duke of Buckingham – 1668
- Walter Norborne, English politician, by an Irishman at the fountain at Middle Temple, London – 1684
- Major Sharington Talbot, Member of Parliament for Chippenham, at the White Hart Inn, Glastonbury, by Captain Love, a fellow-officer of the Wiltshire Militia – 8 July 1685
- John Talbot, brother of the Earl of Shrewsbury, by Henry Fitzroy, 1st Duke of Grafton – 1686
- Sir Henry Hobart, English politician, by Oliver Le Neve on Cawston Heath, Norfolk – 1698

== 18th century ==
- Sir John Hanmer, 3rd Baronet, English politician – 1701
- Charles Mohun, 4th Baron Mohun, perennial duellist, and James Hamilton, 4th Duke of Hamilton, in Hyde Park, London. The Hamilton–Mohun duel – 1712
- Peder Tordenskjold, Norwegian naval officer, by Jakob Axel Staël von Holstein – 1720
- George Lockhart, Scottish politician and writer, Jacobite spy – 1731
- Richard Nugent, Lord Delvin, by Capt. George Reilly at Marlborough Bowling Green, Dublin – 1761
- Button Gwinnett, signer of the Declaration of Independence by Lachlan McIntosh near Savannah, Georgia. The Gwinnett–McIntosh duel – 1777
- Sir Barry Denny, 2nd Baronet – 1794

== 19th century ==
- Philip Hamilton, son of former U.S. Secretary of the Treasury, Alexander Hamilton, by George I. Eacker, in Weehawken, New Jersey – 1801
- Richard Dobbs Spaight, delegate to the Continental Congress and Governor of North Carolina, by John Stanly – 1802
- Peter Lawrence Van Allen, lawyer, by William Harris Crawford, future U.S. Secretary of the Treasury, at Fort Charlotte in South Carolina – 1802
- Alexander Hamilton, former U.S. Secretary of the Treasury, by U.S. Vice President Aaron Burr, in Weehawken, New Jersey – 1804
- Thomas Pitt, 2nd Baron Camelford, English peer and naval officer, by his friend Thomas Best near Holland House, London – 1804
- Charles Dickinson, by future U.S. President Andrew Jackson – 1806
- Robert Case, naval officer, by naval surgeon William Bland at Cross Island, Bombay – 1813
- Charles Lucas, legislator in Missouri Territory, by U.S. Senator Thomas Hart Benton – 1817
- Armistead Thomson Mason, U.S. Senator from Virginia – 1819
- Stephen Decatur, American naval hero, by James Barron – 1820
- John Scott, founder and editor of the London Magazine – 1821
- Joshua Barton, first Missouri Secretary of State – 1823
- Henry Wharton Conway, Arkansas politician – 1827
- Thomas Biddle & Spencer Darwin Pettis (both killed in the same duel) – 1831
- Évariste Galois, mathematician – 1832
- Robert Lyon, last Canadian duelling fatality – 1833
- Aleksandr Pushkin, Russian poet and writer of the Romantic era, by Georges d'Anthès – 1837
- Jonathan Cilley, U.S. Representative from Maine, by William J. Graves – 1838
- Mikhail Lermontov, Russian poet and writer of the Romantic era – 1841
- George A. Waggaman, U.S. Senator from Louisiana – 1843
- James Alexander Seton, the last British person to die in a duel in the United Kingdom – 1845
- John Hampden Pleasants, American newspaper editor – 1846
- Edward Gilbert, U.S. newspaper editor, by James W. Denver near Sacramento – 1852
- Frédéric Constant Cournet, French revolutionary. Killed by Frenchman, Emmanuel Barthélemy in the last duel in the United Kingdom – 1852
- David C. Broderick, U.S. Senator from California – 1859
- Lucius M. Walker, Confederate Civil War general – 1863
- Ferdinand Lassalle, German socialist leader – 1864
- Manuel Corchado y Juarbe, Puerto Rican poet, journalist and politician – 1884
- Felice Cavallotti, Italian radical leader – 1898

== See also ==
- Lists of people by cause of death
- List of famous duels
