= Battle of the Rice Boats =

Part of the American Revolutionary War in Georgia (1776)

- Part of the American Revolutionary War
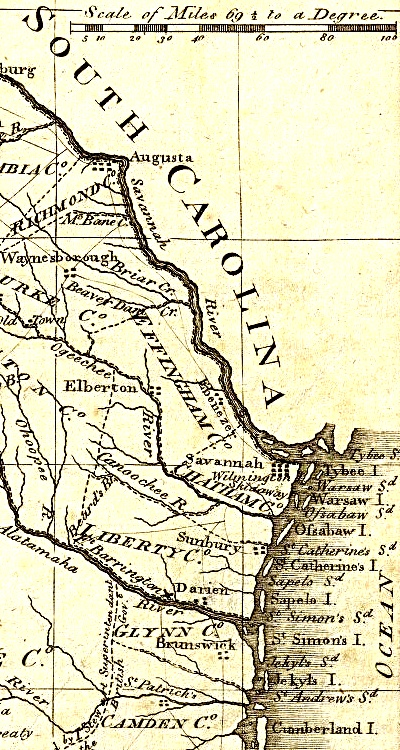
- A 1796 map showing the Savannah area. Hutchinson Island is in the Savannah River near the town.
Date	March 2–3, 1776
Location	near Savannah, Province of Georgia, Savannah River 32°4′52″N 81°5′9″W
Result	See aftermath

Belligerents
(United States) Georgia; South Carolina	Great Britain

Commanders and leaders
Lachlan McIntosh	Andrew Barclay; James Grant

Strength
Land: 800 militia; 3 artillery pieces; 1 shore battery; Sea: 1 fire ship; unknown supply ships	Land: 250–300 infantry; Sea: 4 men-of-war; 2 transports

Casualties and losses
1 wounded 1 fire ship sunk 3 supply ships captured	Unknown; ~2 men-of-war damaged 3 supply ships sunk

The Battle of the Rice Boats, also called the Battle of Yamacraw Bluff, was a land and naval battle of the American Revolutionary War that took place in and around the Savannah River on the border between the Province of Georgia and the Province of South Carolina on March 2 and 3, 1776. The battle pitted the Patriot militia from Georgia and South Carolina against a small fleet of the Royal Navy.

In December 1775, the British Army was besieged in Boston. In need of provisions, a Royal Navy fleet was sent to Georgia to purchase rice and other supplies. The arrival of this fleet prompted the colonial rebels who controlled the Georgia government to arrest the British Royal Governor, James Wright, and to resist the British seizure and removal of supply ships anchored at Savannah. Some of the supply ships were burned to prevent their seizure, some were recaptured, but most were successfully taken by the British.

Governor Wright escaped from his confinement and safely reached one of the fleet's ships. His departure marked the end of British control over Georgia, although it was briefly restored when Savannah was retaken by the British in 1778. Wright again ruled from 1779 to 1782, when British troops were finally withdrawn during the closing days of the war.

== Background ==
In April 1775, tensions over British colonial policies in the Thirteen Colonies boiled over into war with the Battles of Lexington and Concord. Following those events, Patriot colonists surrounded the city of Boston, placing it under siege, although the encirclement was incomplete: the city could be resupplied by sea. News of this action and the June Battle of Bunker Hill fanned the flames of independence throughout the colonies. Although the Province of Georgia had managed to remain relatively neutral before these events, radicals in the Georgia provincial congress came into power during the summer of 1775 and progressively stripped Georgia's Royal Governor, James Wright, of his powers. While Wright had requested a naval presence near Savannah, the colony's capital, Patriots in Charleston, South Carolina, had intercepted his request and substituted for it a dispatch indicating he did not need such support.

The dispute in Georgia reached a crisis point when British men-of-war began arriving at Tybee Island in January 1776. On January 12, three ships were seen at anchor off Tybee Island; by January 18 the fleet consisted of HMS Cherokee, HMS Siren, HMS Raven, HMS Tamar, and a number of smaller vessels. Wright's opinion, expressed to Joseph Clay and others, was that the fleet had been sent to punish the local rebels. In fact, these ships were the beginnings of a fleet assembled to acquire provisions in Savannah for the beleaguered British troops in Boston. In December 1775 General William Howe had ordered an expedition to purchase rice and other provisions in Georgia. By early February the entire fleet had assembled off Tybee Island. It was under the overall command of Captain Andrew Barclay (or Barkley) on HMS Scarborough, and included HMS Hinchinbrook and two transports, Whitby and Symmetry, carrying about 200 British army regulars from the 40th Regiment of Foot under the command of Major James Grant.

The arrival of the first ships in January prompted the Georgia Committee of Safety to order the arrest of Wright and other provincial representatives of the Crown on January 18. Joseph Habersham, a major in the Georgia militia, placed Governor Wright under house arrest, and extracted a promise from the governor that he would not attempt to communicate with the British ships. Wright, who continued to be harassed in spite of his confinement, feared for his life, and escaped the mansion on the night of February 11. He made his way to the plantation of a Loyalist supporter and was taken from there to Scarborough. In the meantime, Georgia's provincial assembly had met, elected representatives to the Second Continental Congress, and begun the process of raising regiments for the Continental Army.

After Governor Wright arrived aboard Scarborough he wrote a letter to the remaining members of his council, in which he expressed frustration over getting assurances of safety and access to the desired supplies from the Patriot authorities. Georgia had, along with the other twelve colonies, in 1774 adopted the terms of the Continental Association created by the First Continental Congress banning trade with Great Britain. With negotiations effectively failed, Barclay ordered his fleet into action on February 29. His objective was a number of merchant vessels docked at Savannah, whose owners were desirous of moving their goods, something that became possible on March 1 when the previous constraints expired.

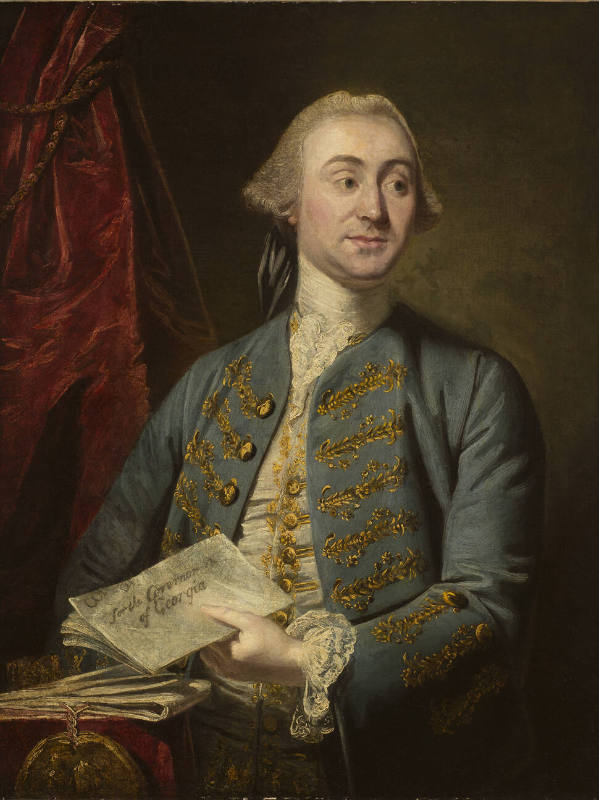
Georgia's last Royal Governor, James Wright

== Battle ==
Colonel Lachlan McIntosh

On March 1, Scarborough, Tamar, Cherokee, and Hinchinbrook sailed up the Savannah River to Five-Fathom Hole, accompanying transports carrying two to three hundred men under Grant's command. Hinchinbrook and one of the transports then sailed up the Back River. The transport anchored opposite the port area, while Hinchinbrook, in an attempt to take a position above the town, grounded on a sandbank in the river. Gunfire from Joseph Habersham's militia cleared Hinchinbrook's decks, but without suitable boats, Habersham was unable to attempt the taking of the vessel, which floated free on the next high tide. Late on the evening of March 2, Grant's men were landed on Hutchinson Island. They made their way across the island, and, at 4:00 am on March 3, took over a number of the rice boats anchored near the island. Due to their success at remaining quiet, and possibly with the collusion of the ship captains, the alarm was not raised in Savannah until 9:00 am. The arrival of the ships on March 1 prompted the Committee of Safety to issue calls for the defense of the town and the ships, which were forwarded along with a request for assistance to South Carolina's Committee of Safety the next day.

When the alarm was raised, Colonel McIntosh took 300 militiamen and set up three 4-pound cannons on Yamacraw Bluff. He then sent Lieutenant Daniel Roberts and Major Raymond Demeré II under a parley flag to one of the occupied ships; they were promptly arrested. When a second, larger, parley arrived to discuss the release of the two captives and the ships, the situation turned nasty when Captain Rogers, leader of the party, was insulted. After he fired at someone on the occupied ship, the British responded in kind, wounding one and very nearly sinking the parley group's boat. Following that boat's retreat, McIntosh opened fire with the cannons on the bluff, beginning a gunbattle that lasted for four hours.

The Committee of Safety, when it met to discuss the situation, decided that the supply ships should be burned, and a company of militia was assembled to accomplish this task. One supply ship, Inverness, was torched and set adrift toward the occupied vessels, causing a scramble as the British hurried to abandon them in the face of the arriving fire ship. During the confusion, the American militia and battery were active, raking the British with musket fire and grape shot. Two of the occupied vessels managed to get away downstream, and two more escaped the flames by going upstream, but were forced to dock, and their crews were taken prisoner. Three ships succumbed to the flames, which burned well into the night. The action was assisted by the timely arrival of 500 South Carolina militia sent in response to the earlier appeal.

== Aftermath ==
Colonel McIntosh sent a parley to Captain Barclay the next day, offering a prisoner exchange. When Barclay refused the exchange, the Committee of Safety ordered the arrest of the remaining members of Wright's council. This move proved successful; the British-held prisoners were released in exchange for promises of protection of those councillors.

In spite of the action, the British successfully sailed most of the merchant ships down the Back River, although some of the ships needed to dump a portion of their cargo in order to make it down the shallow channel. Once they reached Tybee Island, the desired provisions, amounting to 1,600 barrels of rice, were loaded onto the two British transport ships.

The fleet remained anchored off Tybee Island while negotiations went on over the exchange of prisoners. During this time the fleet detained several arriving vessels, which were later disposed of as prizes. On March 25, a band of militia from Savannah burned all the houses on the island to deny their use to Wright and the ships' officers. Barclay weighed anchor on March 30 and sailed north, leading the convoy of merchant ships and transports. As the British had abandoned Boston earlier in March, he first put into Newport, Rhode Island, where the local Patriots denied him any assistance and fired at his ships using field artillery. He eventually rejoined the British forces at Halifax, Nova Scotia, in May.

The battle and Wright's departure marked the end of British control over Georgia until Savannah was recaptured by British forces in December 1778. Governor Wright returned, and Savannah then remained in British hands until 1782.

== See also ==
- Siege of Savannah
