= Richard W. Habersham =

American politician (1786–1842)

Member of the U.S. House of Representatives from Georgia's at-large district
- In office March 4, 1839 – December 2, 1842
- Preceded by: Hopkins Holsey
- Succeeded by: George W. Crawford

Personal details
- Born: December 1786 Savannah, Georgia
- Died: December 2, 1842 (aged 55–56) Clarkesville, Georgia
- Resting place: Old Cemetery in Clarkesville, Georgia

Richard Wylly Habersham (December 1786 – December 2, 1842) was an American lawyer and politician from Savannah, Georgia. From 1839 to 1842, he served two terms in the U.S. House of Representatives until he died in office.

== Education and early career ==
Habersham graduated from Princeton College in 1810. He was appointed United States Attorney and served until his resignation in 1825.

== Congress ==
Running as a Whig, he was elected as a representative from Georgia in the United States House of Representatives from 1839 to 1842, and died in office.

== Personal life ==
Habersham was the nephew of John Habersham, Joseph Habersham and James Habersham Jr.

== Burial ==
He is interred at Old Cemetery in Clarkesville, Georgia.

== See also ==
- List of members of the United States Congress who died in office (1790–1899).

U.S. House of Representatives
Preceded by Hopkins Holsey	Member of the U.S. House of Representatives from Georgia's at-large congressional district March 4, 1839 – December 2, 1842	Succeeded by George W. Crawford
