= Signers Monument =

Monument in Augusta, Georgia, United States

Coordinates: 33.47164°N 81.961546°W

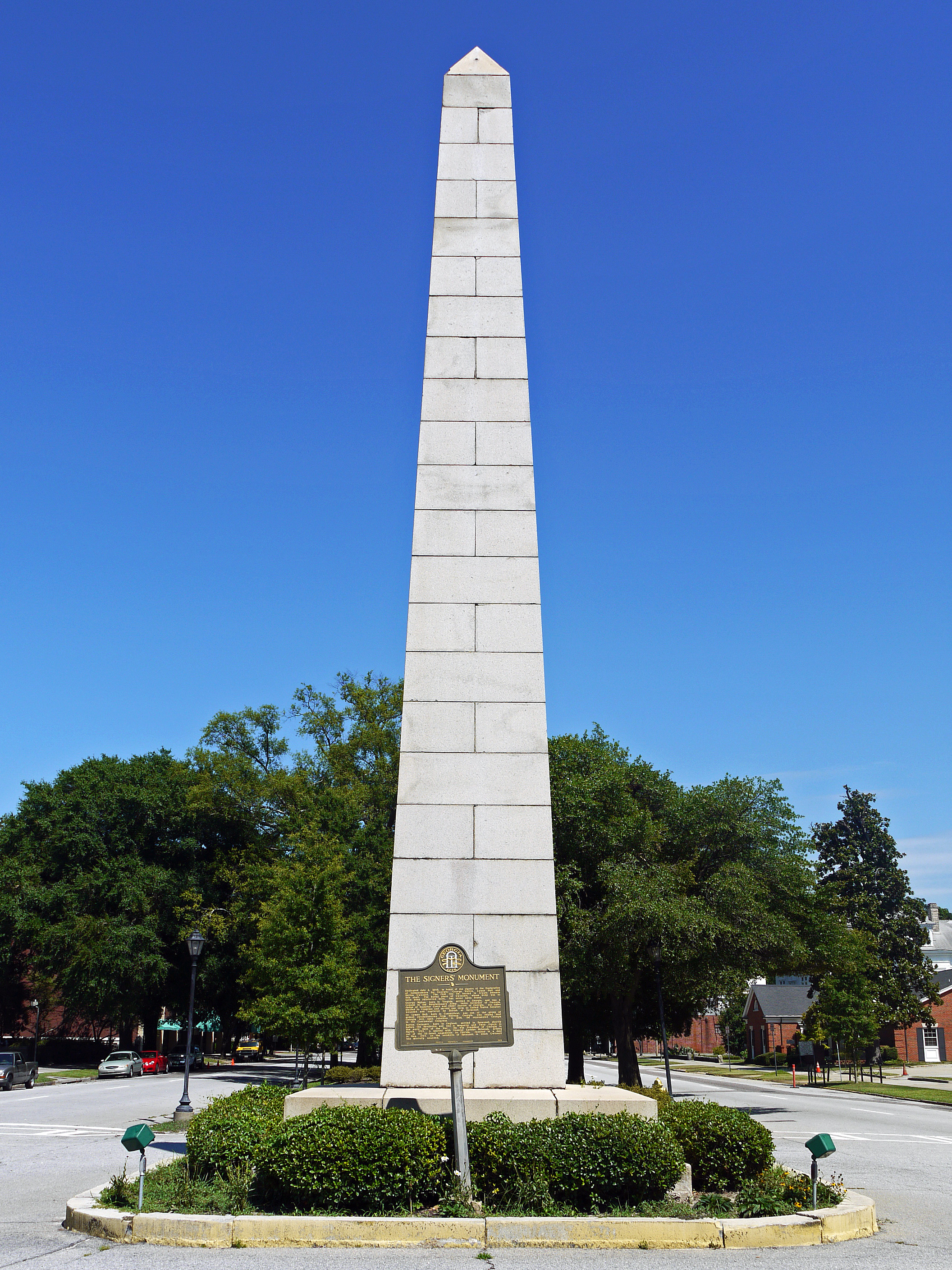
Signers Monument

Signers Monument is a granite obelisk located on Greene Street in Augusta, Georgia, recognizing the state's three signatories of the Declaration of Independence: George Walton, Lyman Hall, and Button Gwinnett, all of whom are considered Founding Fathers of the United States. The remains of Walton and Hall lie beneath the monument, while Gwinnett's have not been located for certain.

== Description ==
The monument, dedicated in 1848, is located at Greene and Monument Streets in front of today's Augusta Municipal Center, which at the time was the location of City Hall. It is a granite obelisk, twelve feet square at the base and tapering to a height of fifty feet. A marble slab in its southern face is engraved in alto-relievo with the coat of arms of Georgia and the names of Gwinnett, Hall, and Walton. The edifice was designed by Robert French and was originally surrounded by a substantial iron railing.

== Re-burial of signers Walton and Hall ==
The initial plan for the monument was to bury the remains of the three Founding Fathers beneath its foundation stones. A committee was appointed to open the graves and superintend the removal and reburial of the men’s bones. In the case of Lyman Hall, his tomb on his plantation in Burke County was well marked, and his remains were easily identified.

Locating George Walton's remains proved only somewhat more difficult. His family's burial ground was at Rosney plantation, about nine miles from Augusta, and while Walton's grave was unmarked, they were able to unearth his skeleton after a careful search of the site. The committee was able to identify the bones as Walton's based on damage to the right femur from a musket shot he had suffered during the British Army’s capture of Savannah in late 1778.

The bones of Button Gwinnett could not be located. Gwinnett died in Savannah in 1777 following a duel with a political rival. While it was generally believed he had been buried in the old cemetery on Savannah's South Broad Street now known as Colonial Park Cemetery, a gravestone bearing his name could not be found. As a result, Walton and Hall were re-interred beneath the monument in a ceremony in 1848, but without Georgia's third signer.

== Gwinnett's remains ==
The location of Button Gwinnett's burial place remained a mystery for more than a century following the monument's dedication. Then in the late 1950s, a retired school principal and amateur historian was able to convince the Georgia Historical Commission to excavate a grave site in the Colonial Park Cemetery he suspected might be Gwinnett's. The dig turned up a badly-preserved skeleton but with an encouraging sign: its left femur was damaged in the area above the knee where Gwinnett had been shot in his duel.

To authenticate the bones as Gwinnett's, the femur was sent to the Smithsonian Institution in Washington, D.C. for analysis. The institute's findings were that the skeleton was too short to be Gwinnett, that the femur was most likely a woman's, and the origin of its damage was ruled post-mortem. The analysis ignited a fierce political battle. After a review by a ballistics expert, who indicated the femur's damage was caused by a pistol ball, the controversy was referred to the city's historic commission, which issued a 34-page report declaring that "beyond a reasonable doubt" the remains were Gwinnett's.

Following the commission report, the skeleton was re-interred at the Savannah cemetery in 1964 and a memorial was erected on the burial site in Gwinnett's honor. The mystery, however, remains unresolved. Based on a newspaper report published the week of the signer's death, most likely Gwinnett was buried at Colonial Park Cemetery, but nobody knows exactly where.

== Dedication ==
When completed, the obelisk was dedicated with a ceremony, which took place on July 4, 1848. Judge William T. Gould pronounced the oration, and the Masonic ceremonies were conducted by the Honorable William C. Dawson, Grand Master of the Georgia lodge.

== See also ==
- Memorial to the 56 Signers of the Declaration of Independence
- Signing of the United States Declaration of Independence
- History of Augusta, Georgia
- History of Georgia (U.S. state)
- Province of Georgia – colonial Georgia
