= 1st Brigade Georgia Militia =

Regiment in the Continental Army

- Active: 1775-1783
- Country: (United States) United Colonies of America
- Allegiance: Georgia
- Branch: (United States Army) Continental Army
- Type: Militia
- Role: Infantry
- Size: Brigade
- Engagements: American Revolutionary War: Siege of Savannah; Siege of Augusta; Battle of Cowpens

The 1st Brigade Georgia Militia was a section of the Georgia Militia, and to a larger extent the Continental Army, during the American Revolutionary War. It typically comprised two or more regiments. The unit was disbanded in 1783 after the war ended.

Elements of the Brigade participated in the failed defense of Fort McIntosh.

== Notable members ==
- James Jackson served in the Brigade and would later go on to represent Georgia in the United States House of Representatives and the United States Senate, and serve as the state's Governor.

== See also ==
- Georgia Line
- List of United States militia units in the American Revolutionary War
