= Memorial to the 56 Signers of the Declaration of Independence =

Memorial in the Constitution Gardens, Washington, D.C.

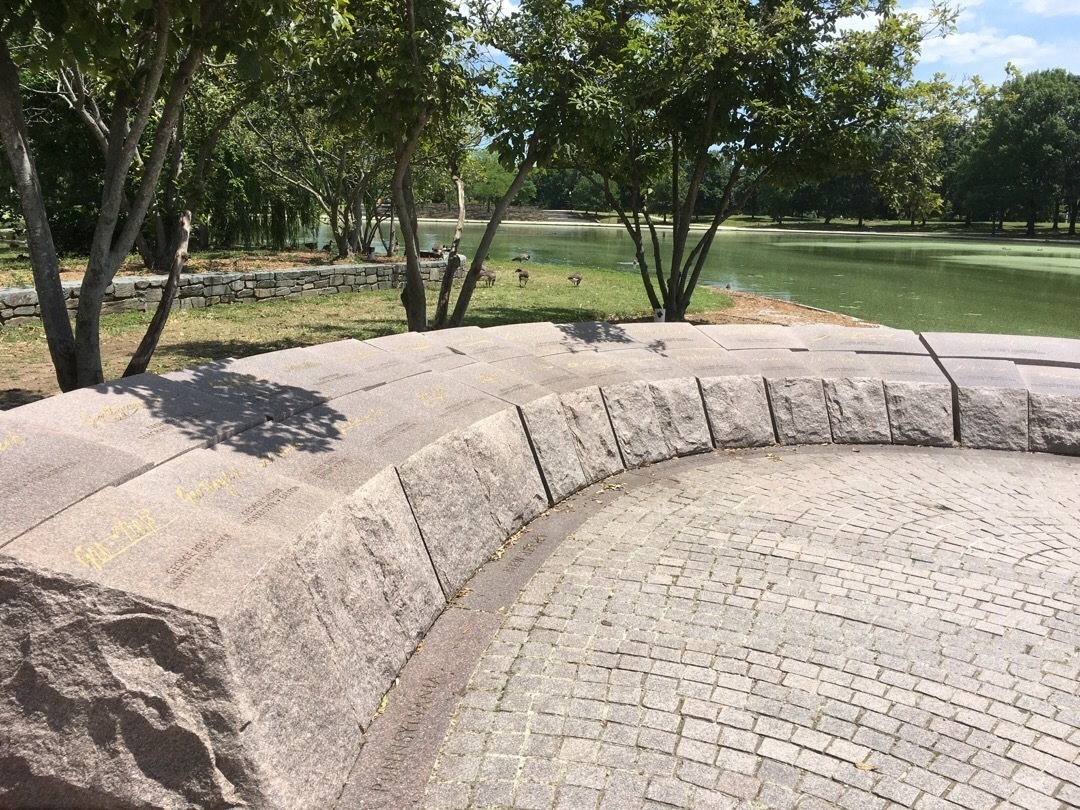
- The memorial on National Mall in Washington, D.C.
- Interactive map of Memorial to the 56 Signers of the Declaration of Independence
- Location: Washington, D.C., United States
- Coordinates: 38°53′28.14″N 77°2′35.052″W
- Established: Authorized: 1978; Dedicated: 1984
- Governing body: National Park Service

The Memorial to the 56 Signers of the Declaration of Independence is a memorial depicting the signatures of the 56 signatories to the United States Declaration of Independence. It is located in the Constitution Gardens on the National Mall in Washington, D.C. The memorial is accessible to the public by crossing a wooden bridge onto a small island set in the lake between Constitution Avenue and the Reflecting Pool, not far from the Vietnam Veterans Memorial.

== History ==
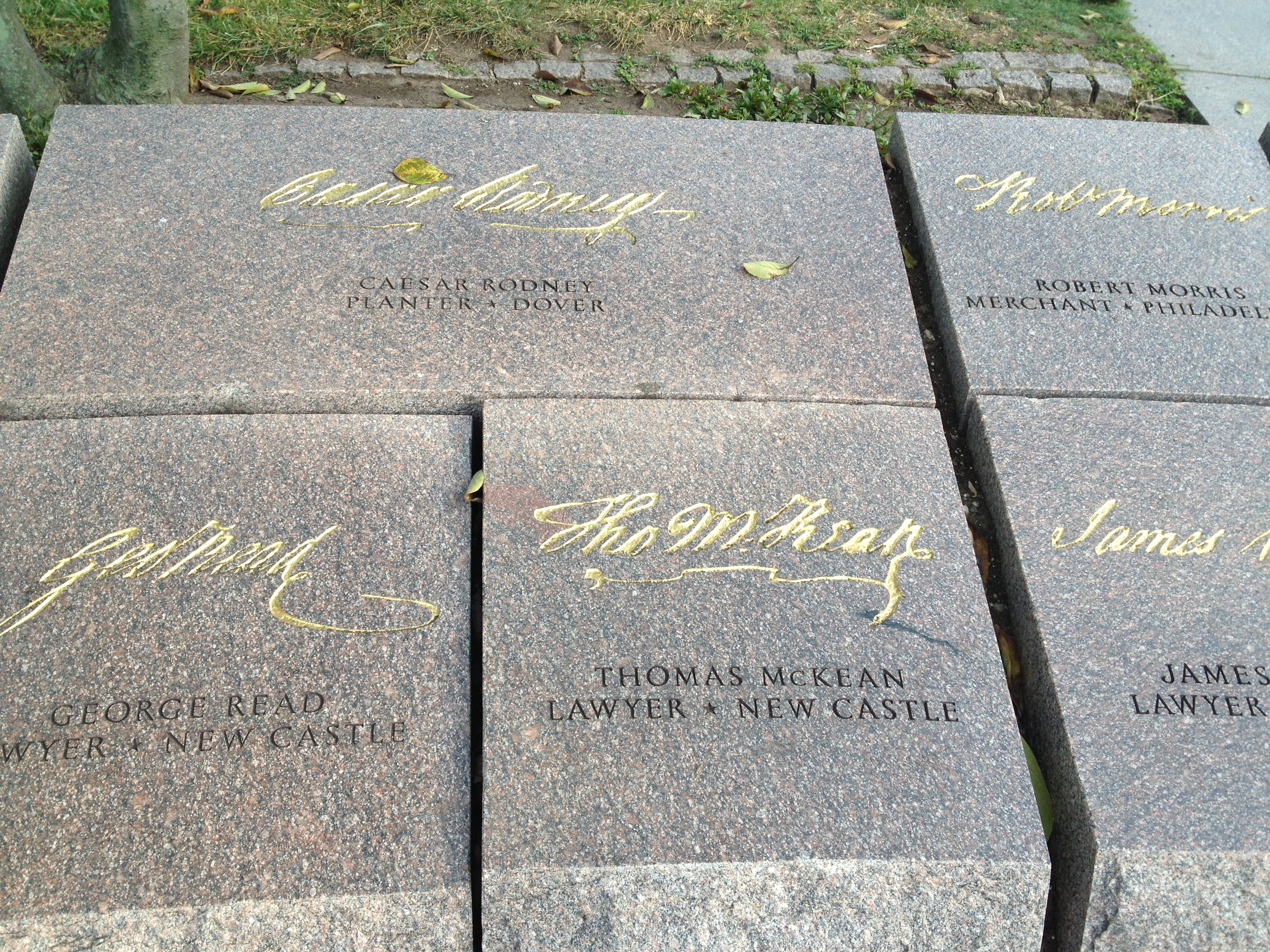
Each memorial stone includes the delegate's signature, name, occupation, and place of residence.

Public Law 95-260 was passed by Congress in 1978 to create a memorial to the signers of the Declaration of Independence. The memorial is a gift from the American Revolution Bicentennial Administration and consists of 56 stone blocks, each with a facsimile of the signer's actual signature, his occupation, and his home town. It was dedicated on July 4, 1984, exactly 208 years after the Congress voted to approve the Declaration of Independence.

== Memorialized signers ==
Fifty-six delegates to the Second Continental Congress signed the Declaration of Independence and are honored at this Memorial:

President of Congress

1. John Hancock (Massachusetts)

New Hampshire

2. Josiah Bartlett
3. William Whipple
4. Matthew Thornton

Massachusetts

5. Samuel Adams
6. John Adams
7. Robert Treat Paine
8. Elbridge Gerry

Rhode Island

9. Stephen Hopkins
10. William Ellery

Connecticut

11. Roger Sherman
12. Samuel Huntington
13. William Williams
14. Oliver Wolcott

New York

15. William Floyd
16. Philip Livingston
17. Francis Lewis
18. Lewis Morris

New Jersey

19. Richard Stockton
20. John Witherspoon
21. Francis Hopkinson
22. John Hart
23. Abraham Clark

Pennsylvania

24. Robert Morris
25. Benjamin Rush
26. Benjamin Franklin
27. John Morton
28. George Clymer
29. James Smith
30. George Taylor
31. James Wilson
32. George Ross

Delaware

33. George Read
34. Caesar Rodney
35. Thomas McKean

Maryland

36. Samuel Chase
37. William Paca
38. Thomas Stone
39. Charles Carroll of Carrollton

Virginia

40. George Wythe
41. Richard Henry Lee
42. Thomas Jefferson
43. Benjamin Harrison
44. Thomas Nelson, Jr.
45. Francis Lightfoot Lee
46. Carter Braxton

North Carolina

47. William Hooper
48. Joseph Hewes
49. John Penn

South Carolina

50. Edward Rutledge
51. Thomas Heyward, Jr.
52. Thomas Lynch, Jr.
53. Arthur Middleton

Georgia

54. Button Gwinnett
55. Lyman Hall
56. George Walton

== See also ==
- Robert R. Livingston, who helped to draft the Declaration as a member of the Committee of Five but was recalled by the state of New York before he could sign the document
- John Rogers, Maryland delegate who voted for the Declaration of Independence but left Philadelphia before the signing.
- Matthew Tilghman, Maryland delegate who voted for the Declaration of Independence but left Philadelphia before the signing.
- Henry Wisner, New York delegate who voted for the Declaration of Independence but left Philadelphia before the signing.
- Charles Thomson, Secretary of the Continental Congress, he and John Hancock's names were the only two to appear on the first printing of the Declaration
- Timothy Matlack engrossed the Declaration of Independence, which was then signed by the Founders.
- Founding Fathers of the United States
- Physical history of the United States Declaration of Independence
  - Independence Hall
  - Syng inkstand
- List of public art in Washington, D.C., Ward 2
- Adams Memorial (proposed)
- Benjamin Franklin National Memorial
- Jefferson Memorial
- Signers Monument
- Washington Monument
- Architecture of Washington, D.C.
