= New Georgia Encyclopedia =

Web-based encyclopedia about the American state of Georgia

- The New Georgia Encyclopedia in 2006
- Editor: John C. Inscoe (Founding editor)
- Language: English
- Subject: Georgia (U.S. state)
- Publication date: 2004–present
- Publication place: United States
- Media type: Online encyclopedia
- OCLC: 1204106854
- Website: georgiaencyclopedia.org

The New Georgia Encyclopedia (NGE) is a web-based encyclopedia containing over 2,000 articles about the state of Georgia. It is a program of Georgia Humanities (GH), in partnership with the University of Georgia Press, the University System of Georgia/Georgia Library Learning Online (GALILEO), and the Office of the Governor.

== History ==
The NGE was launched in 2004. It was the first state encyclopedia to be conceived and designed exclusively for publication online. The idea for the project grew out of the 1996 joint publication of The New Georgia Guide by the Georgia Humanities Council and the University of Georgia Press. The guide, itself a spiritual successor to the New Deal-era American Guide Series, was a literary success. Georgia Humanities and UGA Press then convinced Governor Zell Miller, who commissioned the guide in the first place, to fund the planning and development of a comprehensive print and online state encyclopedia. The name "New Georgia Encyclopedia" was chosen as an homage to the New Georgia Guide and as a reference to the new online medium.

As the project developed, plans for a print volume of the encyclopedia fell through. The planning committee argued that the increased receptiveness to change offered by the online medium would quickly obviate a printed volume. They also stressed that the proposed online-only encyclopedia would abide by the authoritative editorial standards of a print encyclopedia.

== GALILEO ==
Georgia Library Learning Online (GALILEO), a web portal to hundreds of subscription-only databases meant for Georgian libraries and schools, joined UGA Press and GH in fall 1998 as a project partner. GALILEO hosts the NGE website today.

Unlike other state and regional encyclopedias, the project partners and editorial staff believed that the NGE should cover a wide range of subjects, instead of only history and culture. Today, the NGE separates its articles into 10 topics: Arts and Culture, Business and Economy, Counties, Cities, and Neighborhoods, Education, Geography and Environment, Government and Politics, History and Archaeology, Science and Medicine, Sports and Outdoor Recreation, and People. Just under 800 writers contributed to the NGE. The site received 1-2 million page views a month at the beginning of January 2011. The site was redesigned in 2013. Site improvements included updated media players and a search engine for articles compliant with Georgia Educational Standards.

== See also ==
- List of online encyclopedias
