= HMS Cherokee =

Several Royal Navy ships have borne the name HMS Cherokee:

- HMS Cherokee (1808) was the lead ship of the Cherokee class of brig-sloops. She saw service during the Napoleonic Wars. In 1810 she participated in an engagement that resulted in her crew qualifying for the Naval General Service Medal. The Navy sold Cherokee in 1828. She then became a merchantman trading between Liverpool and Africa. Cherokee was wrecked in August 1831 returning to England from Africa.
- HMS Cherokee (1842) was a paddle patrol vessel in service on the Canadian Great Lakes. Sold to the Peruvian Navy in 1853.
- HMS Cherokee (1856) was an Albacore-class wooden screw gunboat.
