= John Habersham =

American politician (1754–1799)

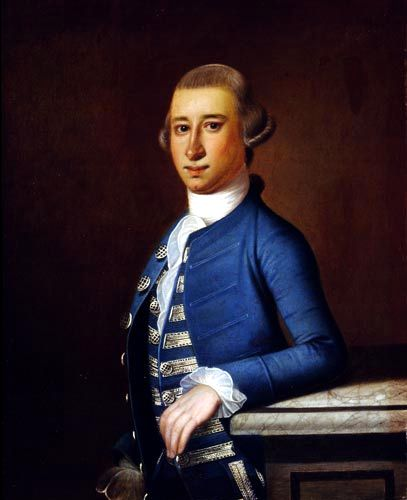
- Born: December 23, 1754; Near Savannah, Province of Georgia
- Died: December 17, 1799 (aged 44); Savannah, Georgia, U.S.

John Habersham (December 23, 1754 – December 17, 1799) was an American merchant, enslaver, planter, and soldier from Georgia.

== Early life ==
Habersham was born at "Beverly," near Savannah, Province of Georgia, in 1754, the son of loyalist official James Habersham, the younger brother of patriot leader Joseph Habersham. They were both the younger brothers of politician James Habersham Jr.

Habersham attended Princeton College.

== Revolutionary War ==
Habersham served as an officer in the 1st Georgia Regiment during the American Revolutionary War. He was a delegate to the Congress of the Confederation in 1785. He was a member of the Society of the Cincinnati of the State of Georgia.

In the 1780s, Habersham owned Bonaventure Plantation.

== Personal life ==
Habersham married Ann Sarah Camber. One of their four known children was Dr. Joseph Clay Habersham.

He was the uncle of politician Richard Wylly Habersham.

== Death ==
Habersham died 1799, aged 44. He was buried in Savannah's Colonial Park Cemetery. His widow died the following year and was interred beside him.
