= James Habersham =

Merchant and politician in the British colony of Georgia

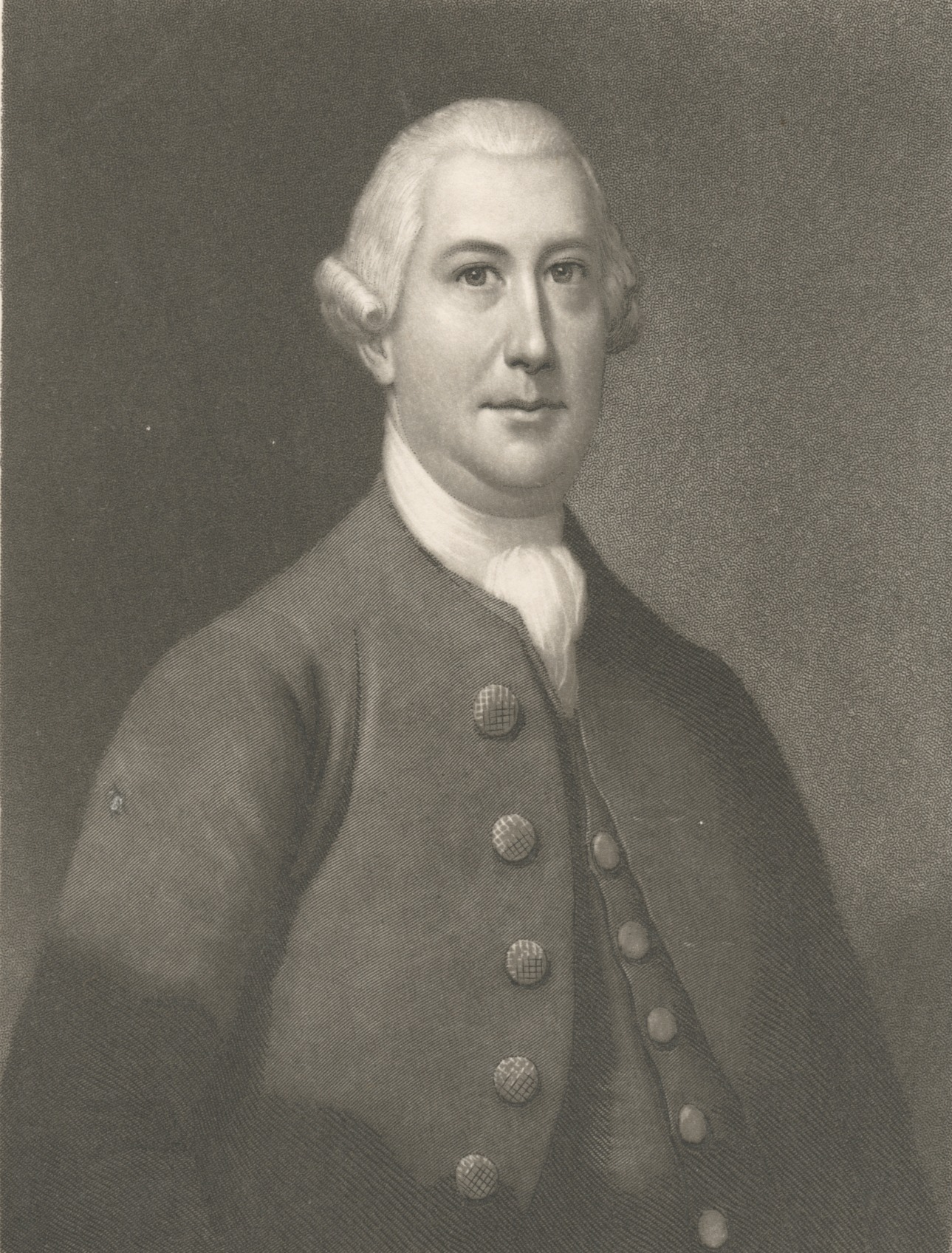
- Born: 26 January 1712; Beverley, Yorkshire
- Died: 28 August 1775 (aged 63); New Brunswick, New Jersey
- Occupations: Merchant, planter, missionary, teacher politician

James Habersham (26 January 1712 – 28 August 1775) was an English-born American merchant, planter, missionary, teacher and politician who lived the majority of his life in the Province of Georgia. Habersham is credited with opening the first direct trade between Savannah, Georgia, and London. He was an influential advocate for slavery in the Thirteen Colonies and served as Secretary of Georgia and as President of the Georgia General Assembly's Upper House. In opposition to his adult sons, Habersham remained loyal to the Crown during the American Revolution.

All three of Habersham's sons became actively involved in the Patriot cause. Joseph Habersham became a zealous revolutionary in 1774. After July 1776, both he and brother John enlisted in the Georgia Line of the Continental Army, while James Jr. contributed to the revolution through political and financial service. The senior Habersham's death in 1775 prevented the painful family division from extending into the war years.

== Early years ==
Coat of Arms of James Habersham

Habersham was born in Beverley, Yorkshire, the son of a freeman and burgess, on 26 January 1712. He was baptised in the Anglican church of St Mary's. In 1722, he moved to London, where he worked as a merchant apprentice. In the 1730s, Habersham began following the teachings of George Whitefield and converted to Methodism. At Whitefield's behest, Habersham traveled to the Province of Georgia as a missionary and schoolteacher in 1738. The decision changed the trajectory of Habersham's life. In addition to Whitefield, Habersham was associated with William Piercy, an English curate whom the Countess of Huntington had appointed to serve as president of Bethesda Orphanage near Savannah, Georgia. It is the oldest extant charity in North America. Habersham taught at Bethesda, and it was there, in Savannah, that he met and married a woman named Mary Bolton.

== Business career ==
In 1744, he became a merchant and set up a partnership with Francis Harris to participate in the burgeoning trade between Georgia and Europe. He and Harris's business was considered the first successful commercial endeavor in Georgia. With resources from this business, Habersham acquired land along rivers for rice planting. After the ban on slavery in Georgia was lifted, his rice fields developed into a massive 15,000-acre plantation worked by 200 slaves.

== Politics ==
By the 1750s, Habersham had become politically influential. His advocacy for the economic benefits of slavery influenced a repeal on the ban of slavery. He was a senior counselor to the royal government of the colony and in 1754 was appointed Secretary of Georgia by King George II. Beginning in 1767, Habersham served as President of the Georgia General Assembly's Upper House. As president of the upper house, he also assumed the position of Lieutenant Governor of Georgia during the 19-month absence of Governor James Wright from 1771 to 1772, who was in England. All three of his sons became supporters of the American Revolution, but Habersham pledged his loyalty to the Crown.

== Death and legacy ==
Habersham died on 28 August 1775, at the age of 63. He is buried in Savannah's Colonial Park Cemetery. Savannah's Habersham Street is named for him.

== Sources ==
- Melton, J. Gordon (2014). Faiths Across Time: 5,000 Years of Religious History [4 Volumes]: 5,000 Years of Religious History. ABC-CLIO. ISBN 978-1-61069-026-3.
