= Fort McIntosh (Georgia) =

Coordinates: 31.221825°N 81.853241°W

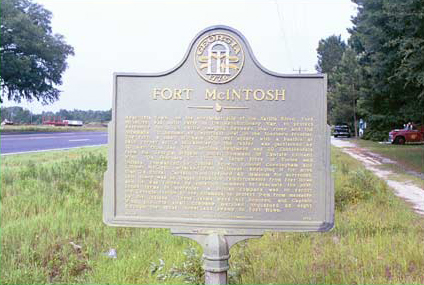
Fort McIntosh Historical Marker

Fort McIntosh is an American military fortification from the American Revolution located near the Satilla River in Brantley County, Georgia, near the present site of the intersection of U.S. Route 82 and Georgia State Route 110 near the town of Atkinson, Georgia.

The log fortress was constructed by William McIntosh, brother of Colonel Lachlan McIntosh, to guard the Georgia frontier against attacks by Tory sympathizing Floridians and hostile Native American tribes. The fort was a square log and earth structure about 100 feet on each side with a bastion at each corner.

On December 28, 1776, the fort was left abandoned after its 27-man garrison deserted following an attack by Native American warriors, which killed 3 men and injured another. The lieutenant in charge of the garrison resigned a month later.

The fort was garrisoned by 40 men from the 3rd South Carolina Regiment and 20 Continentals from the 1st Brigade Georgia Militia, under command of Captain Richard Winn.

On February 17, 1777, the base was attacked by Tories and Indians and forced to surrender the next day. All of the prisoners were released with the exception of two officers who were taken as hostages to St. Augustine, Florida. One of the officers taken to St. Augustine was Lieutenant Daniel McDuff of the 3rd Spartan Regiment. The capture of the fort led to fears of a large British offensive into Georgia, however no offensive resulted.
