= Joseph Habersham =

American politician (1751–1815)

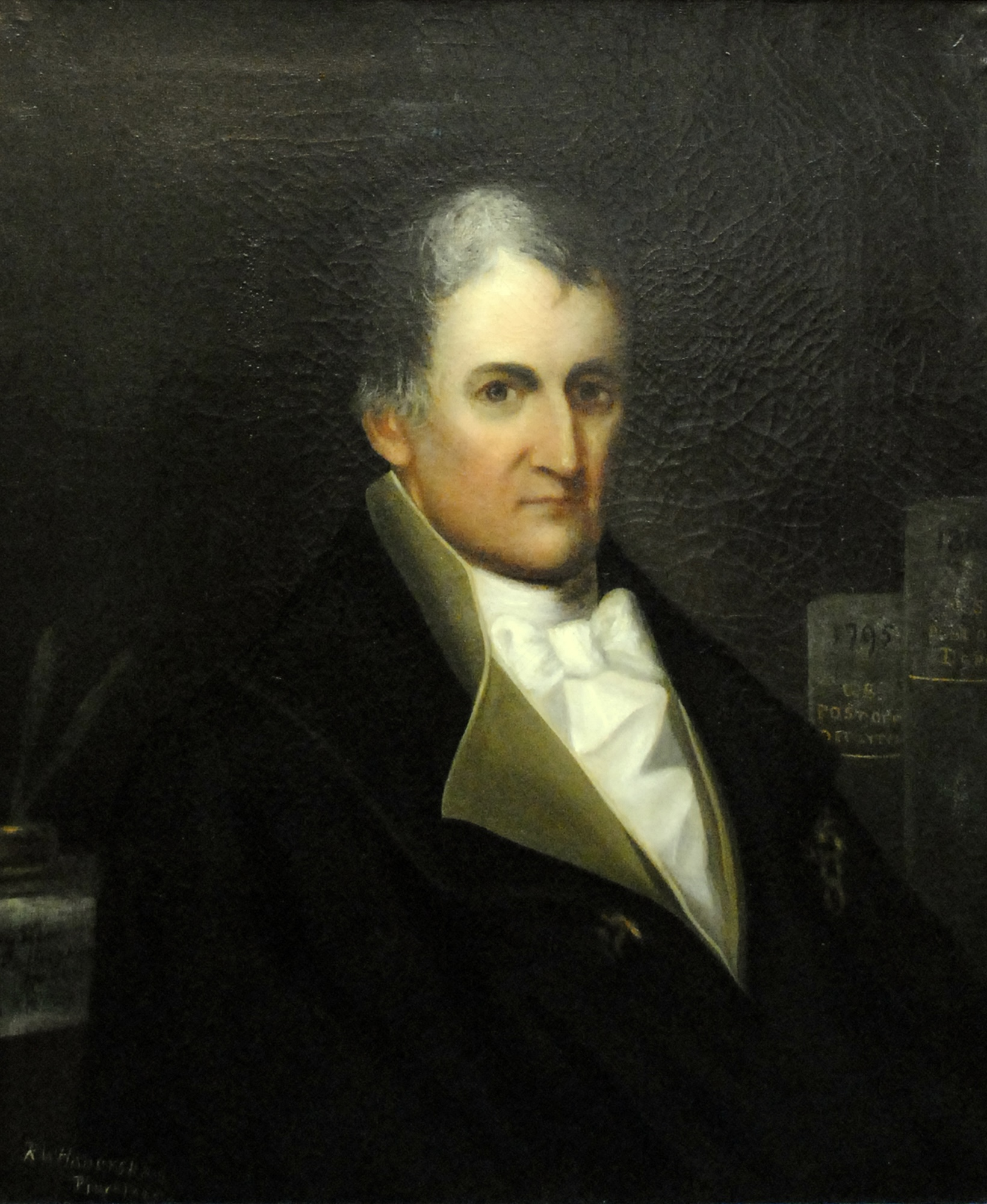
- Posthumous portrait, c. 1884

6th United States Postmaster General
- In office February 25, 1795 – November 28, 1801
- President: George Washington; John Adams; Thomas Jefferson
- Preceded by: Timothy Pickering
- Succeeded by: Gideon Granger

Speaker of the Georgia House of Representatives
- In office 1782 2nd Adjournment - 1782 3rd Adjournment; 1785

3rd Mayor of Savannah, Georgia
- In office 1792; 1793

Personal details
- Born: July 28, 1751 Savannah, Georgia, British America
- Died: November 17, 1815 (aged 64) Savannah, Georgia, U.S.
- Party: Independent
- Education: Princeton University

Military service
- Allegiance: United States
- Branch/service: Militia; Continental Army
- Rank: Major; Colonel
- Battles/wars: American Revolutionary War

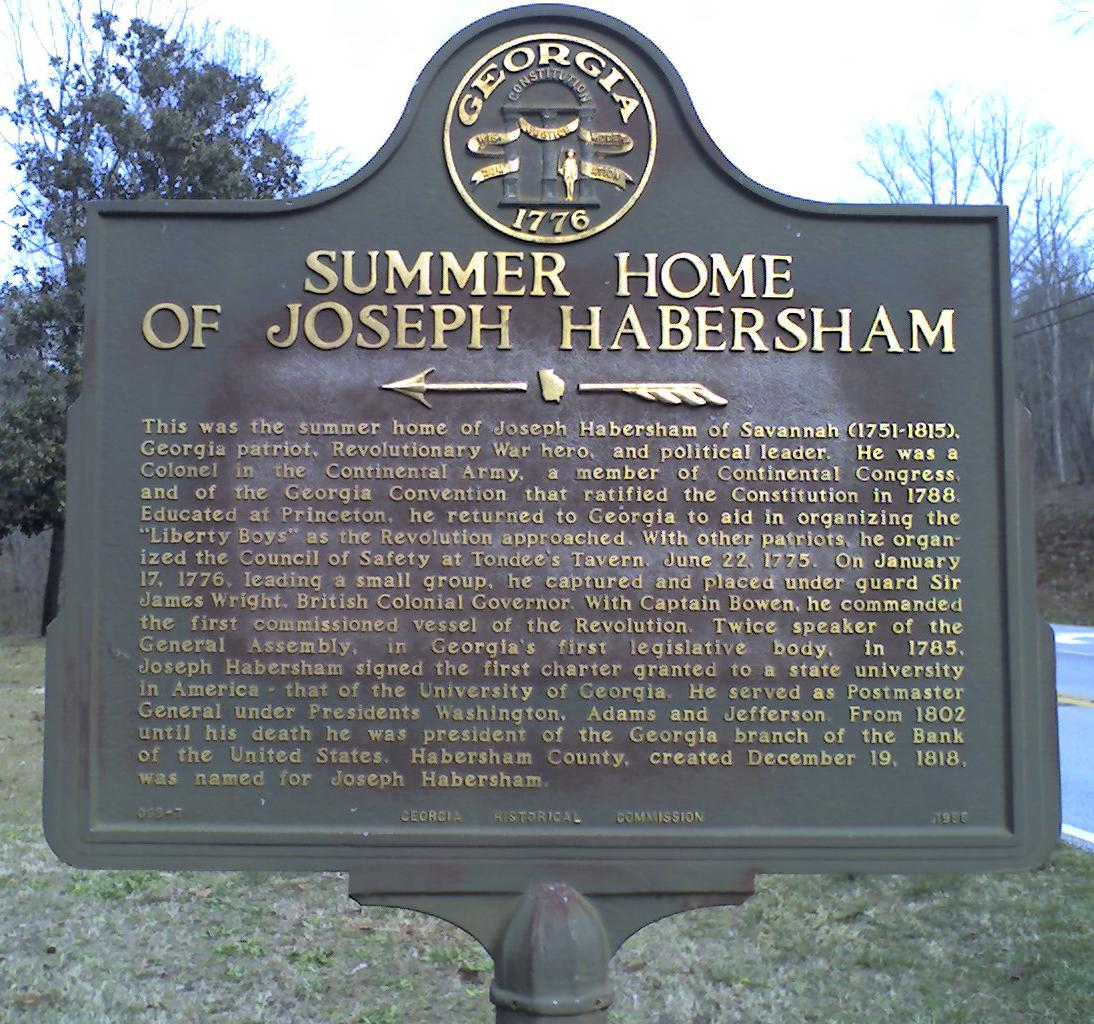
Historical marker at Joseph Habersham's summer home, Clarkesville, Georgia

Joseph Habersham (July 28, 1751 – November 17, 1815) was an American businessman, Georgia politician, soldier in the Continental Army, and Postmaster General of the United States.

== Early years ==
Born in Savannah, Georgia, to James Habersham and Mary Bolton, he attended preparatory schools and Princeton College and became successful merchant and planter. He was married to Isabella Rae, who was the sister-in-law of Col. Samuel Elbert. They had one son, Robert Habersham.

== American Revolution ==
He was a member of the council of safety and the Georgia Provincial Council in 1775 and a major of a battalion of Georgia militiamen and subsequently a colonel in the 1st Georgia Regiment of the Continental Army. He had to resign from the army after he served as Lachlan McIntosh's second in the controversial duel that killed Button Gwinnett.

== Political career ==
He and his brothers, James Jr. and John, were active in Georgia politics. Some older references state that Joseph was a delegate to the Confederation Congress in 1785, but this may stem from confusion with his brother John, who was a delegate at that time. Joseph served as Speaker of the Georgia House in 1782 and again in 1785 and was a member of the Georgia convention in 1788 that ratified the U.S. Constitution.

He served as mayor of Savannah from 1792 to 1793 and then was appointed Postmaster General by President George Washington in 1795 and served until the beginning of Thomas Jefferson's administration in 1801. When Habersham created the office of first assistant postmaster-general in 1799, Abraham Bradley Jr. was appointed to the office. In 1802, Bradley named one of his sons, Joseph Habersham Bradley (later a notable Washington, D.C. attorney), after his former superior.

== Death and legacy ==
Habersham died in 1815. He is buried in Savannah's Colonial Park Cemetery. Habersham County in Northeast Georgia, from its creation in 1818, is named in his honor.

Joseph Habersham was also a Savannah Freemason. He is recorded as a masonic member of Solomon's Lodge No. 1, F. & A. M. at Savannah, Georgia. Solomon's Lodge No. 1, F. & A. M. at Savannah was founded by renowned statesman, philanthropist and Freemason James Edward Oglethorpe on February 21, 1734. Joseph Habersham's father James Habersham, both of his brothers, and his noted descendant, the Savannah Painter, Richard West Habersham (the intimate friend of Samuel F. B. Morse inventor of the telegraph) were all Freemasons and members of Solomon's Lodge.

The Joseph Habersham Chapter of the National Society Daughters of the American Revolution, located in Atlanta, is named in Habersham's honor, as is their headquarters, Habersham Memorial Hall.

== See also ==
- List of speakers of the Georgia House of Representatives

Political offices
Preceded by Thomas Gibbons	Mayor of Savannah; 1792–1793	Succeeded by William Stephens
Preceded by Vacant	United States Postmaster General; Served under: George Washington, John Adams, Thomas Jefferson; 1795 – 1801	Succeeded by Gideon Granger
