= Don Carlos Seitz =

American journalist

Don Carlos Seitz (October 24, 1862 in Portage, Ohio - 1935) was an American newspaper manager.

In 1880 he graduated from the Liberal Institute at Norway, Maine. He served as Albany correspondent (1887–89) and as city editor (1889–91) of the Brooklyn Eagle, was assistant publisher of the New York Recorder (1892–93) and managing editor of the Brooklyn World (1893–94), and thenceforth was connected with the New York World as advertising manager (1895–97) and as business manager after 1898. He died in 1935. He had a son who died at eight and a half in 1907 and two daughters.

== Books ==
- Discoveries in Everyday Europe (1907)
- Writings by and about James McNeill Whistler (1910)
- Elba and Elsewhere (1910)
- Surface Japan (1911)
- Letters from Francis Parkman to E. G. Squier (1911)
- The Buccaneers (1912)
- Whistler Stories (1913)
- Braxton Bragg, general of the Confederacy (1924)
- Joseph Pulitzer; His Life and Letters (New York, NY: Simon & Schuster, 1924)
- Under the Black Flag: Exploits of the Most Notorious Pirates (1925)
- The Great Island: Some observations in and about the Crown Colony of Newfoundland (1926)
- Famous American Duels (1929)
- The Dreadful Decade: Detailing Some Phases in the History of the United States from Reconstruction to Resumption, 1869-1879 (1929)
- Lincoln the Politician: How the Rail-Splitter and Flatboatman Played the Great American Game (1931)
