= Lachlan McIntosh =

American army officer and politician (1725–1806)

- Born: March 17, 1725; Raits, Badenoch, Scotland, Great Britain
- Died: February 20, 1806 (aged 80); Savannah, Georgia, U.S.
- Military career
- Allegiance: Great Britain; United Colonies; United States
- Branch: British Army; Continental Army
- Service years: 1742–1748 (British Army); 1775–1783 (Continental Army)
- Rank: Brigadier general (Continental Army)
- Unit: Oglethorpe's Regiment
- Commands: 1st Georgia Regiment; Western Department
- Conflicts: War of Jenkins' Ear; Invasion of Georgia (1742); Battle of Bloody Marsh; American Revolutionary War; Battle of the Rice Boats; Siege of Savannah

Brigadier General Lachlan McIntosh (March 17, 1725 – February 20, 1806) was a British-American army officer and politician who served in the War of Jenkins' Ear and American Revolutionary War. In a 1777 duel, he fatally shot Button Gwinnett, one of the signers of the Declaration of Independence.

== Early life ==
Lachlan McIntosh was born on March 17, 1725, near Raits, Scotland. McIntosh's father, John Mòr McIntosh, moved the family to the British colony of Georgia, in 1736, alongside the 100 other British (Scottish) settlers, with the group founding the town of New Inverness at the mouth of the Altamaha River following their arrival. John led the colonists as they carved out the new settlement from dense forest. The dangers of frontier life were brought home to McIntosh in 1737 when his younger brother Lewis was killed by an alligator while swimming in the river.

Georgia was then governed by General James Oglethorpe, who had founded the colony in 1732. It was a highly militarized colony, as clashes with neighboring Spanish Florida and its fortress city of St. Augustine to the south were common. During the siege of Fort Mose in 1740, fought as part of the War of Jenkins' Ear, McIntosh's father was captured by the Spanish and held prisoner for two years. The elder McIntosh was eventually released, but his health had deteriorated during his captivity, and he died a few years later. Before his death he had supported the Georgia Trustees in their opposition to the introduction of slavery into Georgia, which was demanded by an increasing number of local colonists who demanded free labor. This earned him the gratitude of Oglethorpe. The "Mòr" of his title is Scots Gaelic for "big".

After his father's death, McIntosh was sent to the Bethesda Orphanage in Savannah under the care of the noted evangelist George Whitefield. His elder brother William served under Oglethorpe and helped to repulse a Spanish invasion of the colony. McIntosh spent two years at the orphanage before traveling to Fort Frederica and joining James Oglethorpe's Regiment of Foot of the British Army in April 1742 as a cadet. On 18 July 1742 he participated in the Battle of Bloody Marsh, at which Oglethorpe led a British and Indian force which defeated Spanish invaders from Florida. When the Jacobite rising of 1745 broke out in Scotland McIntosh and his brother William planned to travel to Scotland and join the rebellion, but Oglethorpe, who had become a friend and mentor to the young McIntosh, convinced them to remain in Georgia.

McIntosh's brother William has sometimes been confused with Muscogee chief William McIntosh, who was their cousin. The Creek William McIntosh was the son of Capt. William McIntosh, a Tory in the American Revolutionary War, and a high-status Creek woman. The senior William McIntosh was the son of Capt. John McIntosh, who had immigrated with his brother Roderick, and with John "Mòr" McIntosh from Scotland, Great Britain. Confusion about the names stems from the fact that on their ship The Prince of Wales, at least five males were named John McIntosh in one form or another. In 1748, McIntosh left his regiment and moved to Charleston, South Carolina, where he took a position as a clerk for Henry Laurens, a wealthy merchant and slave trader. Laurens became a lifelong friend and mentor. In 1756, McIntosh married Sarah Threadcraft. He soon returned with her to Georgia, where he studied surveying. He acquired land in the Altamaha River delta and Black slaves to work it; he became a prosperous rice planter.

== American Revolution ==
=== Early war ===
By 1770, McIntosh had become a leader in the resistance movement in Georgia. In January 1775 he helped organize delegates to the Provincial Congress from the Darien District of St. Andrew Parish. On January 7, 1776, McIntosh was commissioned as a colonel in the Georgia Militia. He raised the 1st Georgia Regiment of the Georgia Line, organized the defense of Savannah, and helped repel a British assault at the Battle of the Rice Boats in the Savannah River. He was promoted to the rank of brigadier general in the Continental Army, charged with defense of Georgia's southern flank from British incursions from Florida, by then a British possession. On October 22, 1776, McIntosh ordered his brother William to construct a fort on the Satilla River to protect Georgia from Florida. The fort was the first to be named Fort McIntosh.

=== Duel with Button Gwinnett ===
During the period of 1776 to 1777, McIntosh became embroiled in a bitter political dispute with Button Gwinnett, the Speaker of the Georgia Provisional Congress and a radical Whig leader. Their bitter personal rivalry began when McIntosh succeeded Gwinnett as commander of Georgia's Continental Battalion in early 1776. The two men represented opposing factions in a deeply divided Patriot movement in Georgia. Gwinnett had been forced to step aside after his election had been called into question by opposing forces within the independence movement. Gwinnett, thwarted in his military ambitions, became a delegate to the Continental Congress and a signer of the United States Declaration of Independence. He returned to Georgia after his allies gained control of the Provisional Congress and succeeded in electing him speaker. Shortly afterward, he was elected president and commander-in-chief of the Committee of Safety.

Gwinnett began purging the government and the military of his political rivals. One of his early targets was George McIntosh, Lachlan's brother, who had opposed Gwinnett's election. Gwinnett had George arrested and charged with treason against the revolution. In addition, Gwinnett had ordered Lachlan McIntosh to lead a poorly planned military expedition into British Florida. The operation was a disaster; and Gwinnett and McIntosh publicly blamed each other for the failure, straining the already tenuous relationship between the two men.

On May 1, 1777, Lachlan McIntosh, a staunch supporter of John Treutlen for Governor, addressed the Georgia assembly and denounced Gwinnett in the harshest terms, calling Gwinnett a "scoundrel and lying rascal." Gwinnett sent a written challenge to McIntosh demanding an apology or satisfaction. McIntosh refused to apologize, and Gwinnett challenged him to a duel.

On May 16, in a field owned by James Wright a few miles east of Savannah, Gwinnett and McIntosh met to duel with pistols. At a distance of 12 paces, the two men leveled and fired virtually simultaneously. Gwinnett received a ball to the thigh and McIntosh was struck in the leg. McIntosh would recover from his wounds, but Gwinnett's wound was mortal and he died three days later. Gwinnett's allies had McIntosh charged with murder, but he was acquitted in the ensuing trial. George Washington, fearing Gwinnett's allies would take revenge on McIntosh, ordered him to report to Continental Army headquarters on October 10. He spent the winter of 1777–1778 with the Continental Army at Valley Forge, Pennsylvania, where he commanded several regiments of North Carolina troops.

=== Military service on the western frontier and in the South ===
On May 26, 1778, McIntosh was given command of the Western Department of the Continental Army, headquartered at Fort Pitt (present-day Pittsburgh, Pennsylvania) on the Pennsylvania frontier. He restored order along the frontier and conceived a plan to attack the British stronghold of Fort Detroit. He established several new forts including Fort Laurens, named for his friend and mentor Henry Laurens, who had become President of the Continental Congress, and Fort McIntosh (present-day Beaver, Pennsylvania) to prepare for the attack. The expedition against Fort Detroit was doomed however, and the troops were forced to turn back before reaching the fort.

McIntosh was replaced as commander of the Western Department by Colonel Daniel Brodhead on March 5, 1779. Washington ordered McIntosh to return to the south to join General Benjamin Lincoln in Charleston, South Carolina. He marched to Augusta, Georgia, in command of the Georgia troops, and then proceeded to Savannah, where he commanded the 1st and 5th South Carolina regiments during the siege of Savannah.

After the battle, he retired his troops to Charleston, where he remained to defend the city from the British Army. On May 12, 1780, General Lincoln was forced to surrender the city to British General Sir Henry Clinton. McIntosh was taken prisoner and remained in captivity until he was exchanged on February 9, 1782, for Charles O'Hara. The war was brought to an end in 1783 with the Peace of Paris which recognized American independence and transferred East and West Florida to Spain.

== Later years ==
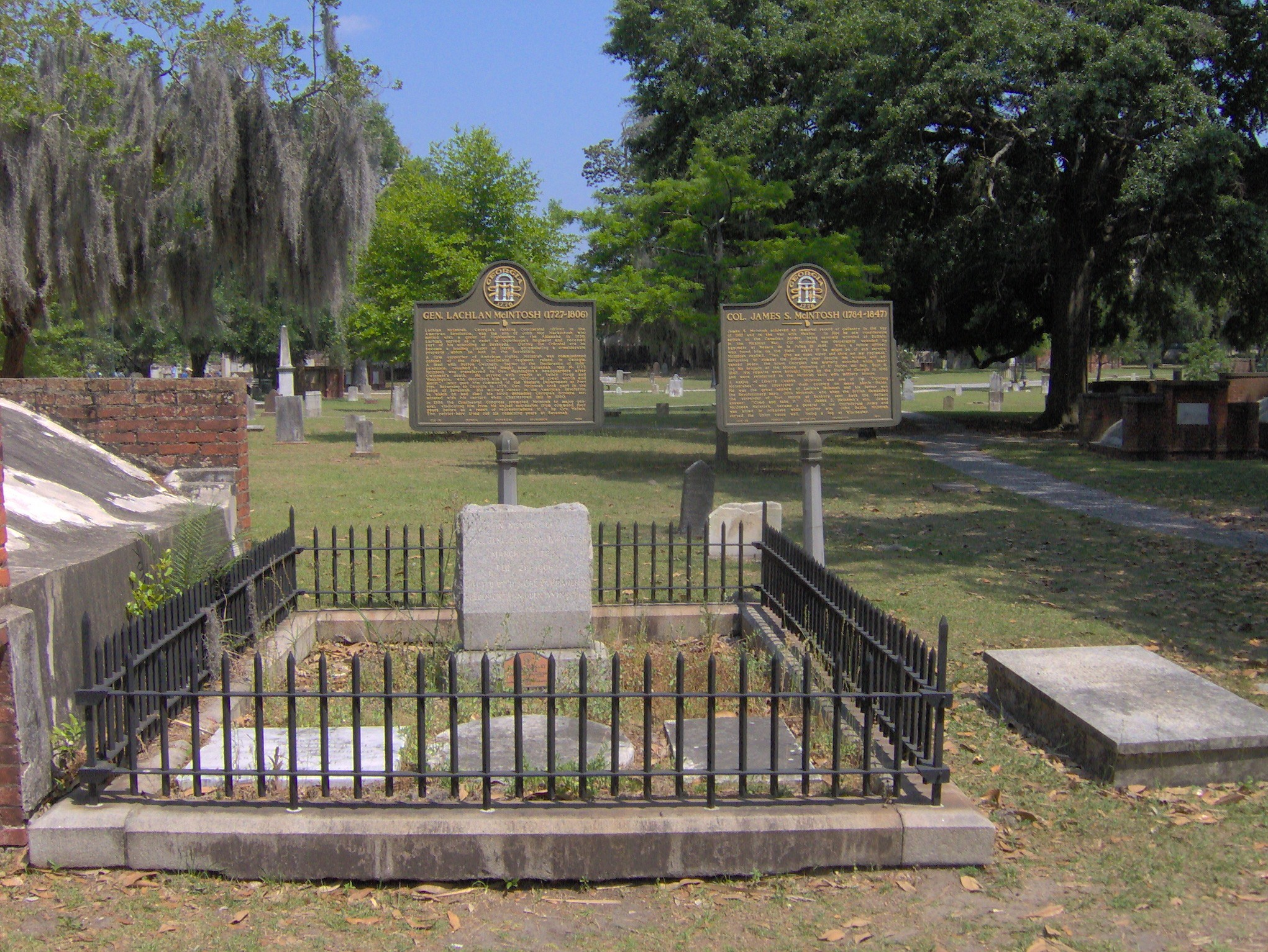
The grave of Lachlan McIntosh at Colonial Park Cemetery

McIntosh returned to his plantation to find it ruined by the occupying British. McIntosh tried to restore his property and business interests, but he would spend the rest of his life in relative poverty. He was elected to the Continental Congress in 1784, but never attended. In 1785, he was appointed a commissioner to treat with the southern American Indian tribes. In 1787, he was asked to help settle a boundary dispute between Georgia and South Carolina. In 1789, Lachlan was the replacement candidate by President Washington after the rejection of Benjamin Fishbourn's nomination to a federal position in Georgia was rejection under Senatorial courtesy, setting precedence and being the first instance of a Presidential nominee to a federal position being rejected. McIntosh was an original member of the Society of the Cincinnati and in 1791 he was part of the delegation that officially welcomed President George Washington to Georgia.

McIntosh died in Savannah, Georgia, on February 20, 1806.

McIntosh is buried alongside his great-nephew Colonel James S. McIntosh (1784–1847) at Colonial Park Cemetery in Savannah's historic district. His great-great-nephews, James M. McIntosh and John Baillie McIntosh, were generals on opposite sides in the American Civil War.

== Legacy and honors ==
- The state of Georgia named McIntosh County in honor of his family. (The state also has a county named for Button Gwinnett, the man he killed in a duel.)
