= James Habersham Jr. =

American merchant, slave trader, planter and politician

- Habersham around 1780
- Born: 1745; Savannah, Georgia
- Died: July 2, 1799 (aged 53–54); Savannah, Georgia
- Occupations: Merchant, slave trader, planter, politician

James Habersham Jr. (c. 1745 – July 2, 1799) was an American merchant, slave trader, planter and politician who served as the speaker of the Georgia General Assembly in 1782 and 1784.

== Early life ==
Habersham was born in Savannah, Georgia, c. 1745, the son of James and Mary Habersham. He was the youngest brother of Joseph Habersham and John Habersham, who were prominent Patriots during the American Revolution. For his part, James provided political and financial service. Habersham attended the College of New Jersey, but did not graduate. He is believed to be the first student from Georgia to attend the college. Habersham subsequently married Hester Wylly, who was born in Ireland.

== Mercantile career ==
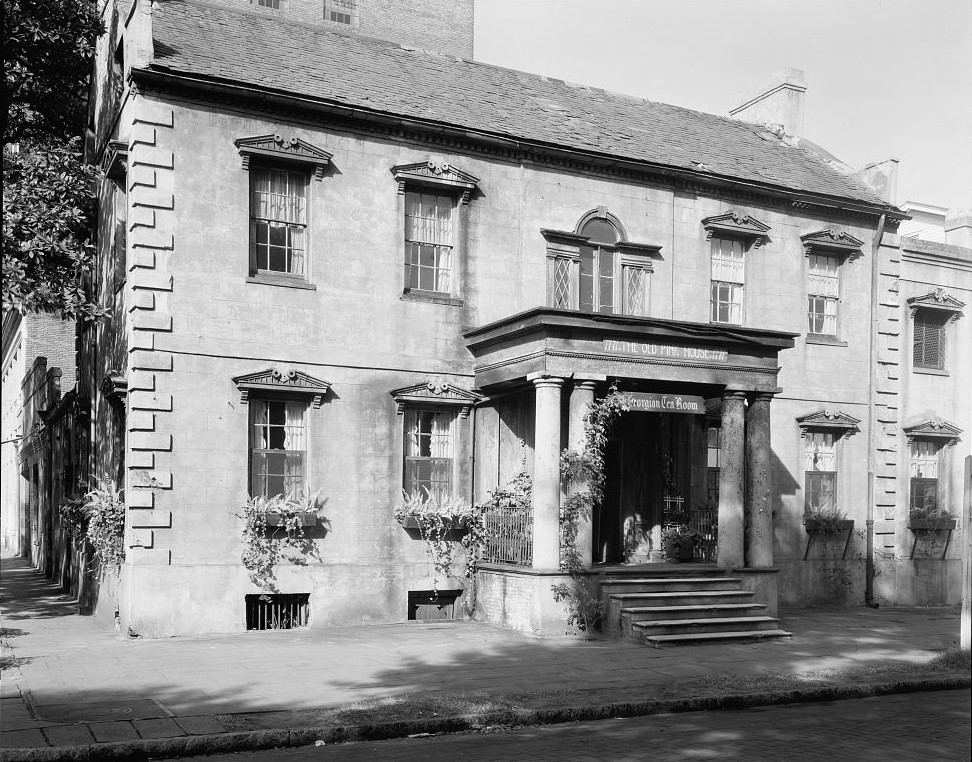
Habersham House around 1940

Though according to his father, Habersham was "gentleman that is not overly fond of business", he founded a mercantile firm which specialized in importing goods with his cousin Joseph Clay in the 1760s. The firm imported hundreds of African slaves to Savannah, some of which were advertised as being "direct from the River Gambia". Habersham also owned slave plantations on both the Savannah River and Broad River in South Carolina. He also served on the board of trustees which established the University of Georgia in 1785.

== Habersham House ==
In 1789, construction was completed of Habersham House in Savannah's Reynolds Square. Habersham lived there until his death on July 2, 1799, aged 53 or 54. He is buried in Savannah's Colonial Park Cemetery.
