= Colonial Park Cemetery =

Historic cemetery in Savannah, Georgia, United States

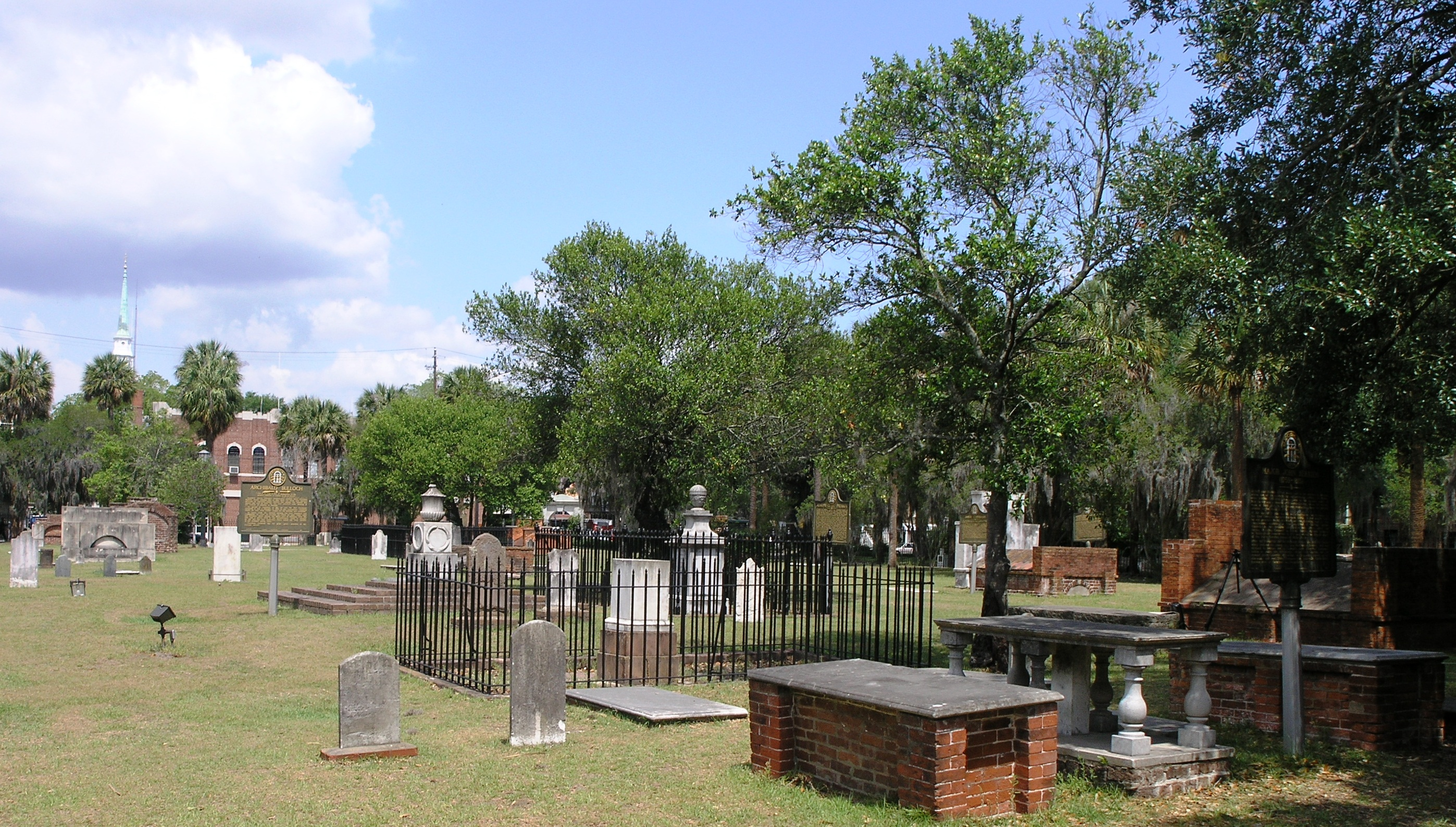
- Inside the cemetery, looking west toward its boundary with Abercorn Street
- Interactive map of Colonial Park Cemetery

Details
- Established: 1750 (276 years ago); Closed to burials in 1853 (173 years ago)
- Location: 200 Abercorn Street; Savannah, Georgia
- Country: United States
- Coordinates: 32°04′31″N 81°05′24″W
- Type: Public municipal
- Owned by: City of Savannah
- Size: 6 acres (2.4 ha)
- No. of graves: est. 9,000
- Find a Grave: Colonial Park Cemetery

Colonial Park Cemetery (locally and informally known as Colonial Cemetery; historically known as the Old Cemetery) is an 18th- and early 19th-century burial ground located in downtown Savannah, Georgia. It became a city park in 1896, 43 years after burials in the cemetery ceased, and is open to visitors.

The cemetery was established in 1750, when Savannah was the capital of the British Province of Georgia, last of the Thirteen Colonies. By 1789 it had expanded three times to reach its current six acres bounded by East Oglethorpe Avenue (to the north), Habersham Street (east), East Perry Lane (south) and Abercorn Street (west). Savannah's primary public cemetery throughout its 103 active years, its previous names have included the Old Cemetery, Old Brick Graveyard, South Broad Street Cemetery, and Christ Church Cemetery.

== History ==
Originally built as the burial ground for Christ Church Parish, the city's Church of England congregation, in 1789 it became a cemetery for Savannahians of all denominations.

The Gaston Tomb was built in Colonial Park Cemetery in 1844, but was moved to Bonaventure Cemetery in 1873.

The cemetery was closed to burials in 1853, some eight years before the start of the American Civil War, so no Confederate soldiers are interred there. After Union troops occupied Savannah on December 24, 1864, the graveyard became a temporary home to "several hundred" Union soldiers. Soldiers allegedly damaged or defaced some of the stone markers (including altering some dates and ages) and sheltered inside vaults, including the Gaston Tomb.

== Notable burials ==
- John Berrien (1759–1815), major in the American Revolution (father of John M. Berrien, senator and attorney general)
- Archibald Bulloch (1730–1777), governor of Georgia's Provincial Congress
- Samuel Elbert (1740–1788), Revolutionary soldier and a governor of the state of Georgia
- Button Gwinnett (1735–1777), a signer of the Declaration of Independence
- James Habersham (1712–1775), acting royal governor of the Province of Georgia (father of John, Joseph and James Habersham Jr.)
- John Habersham (1754–1799), member of the Continental Congress (son of James Habersham, brother of Joseph and James Habersham Jr.)
- Joseph Habersham (1751–1815), Postmaster General of the United States under three presidents (son of James Habersham, brother of John and James Habersham Jr.)

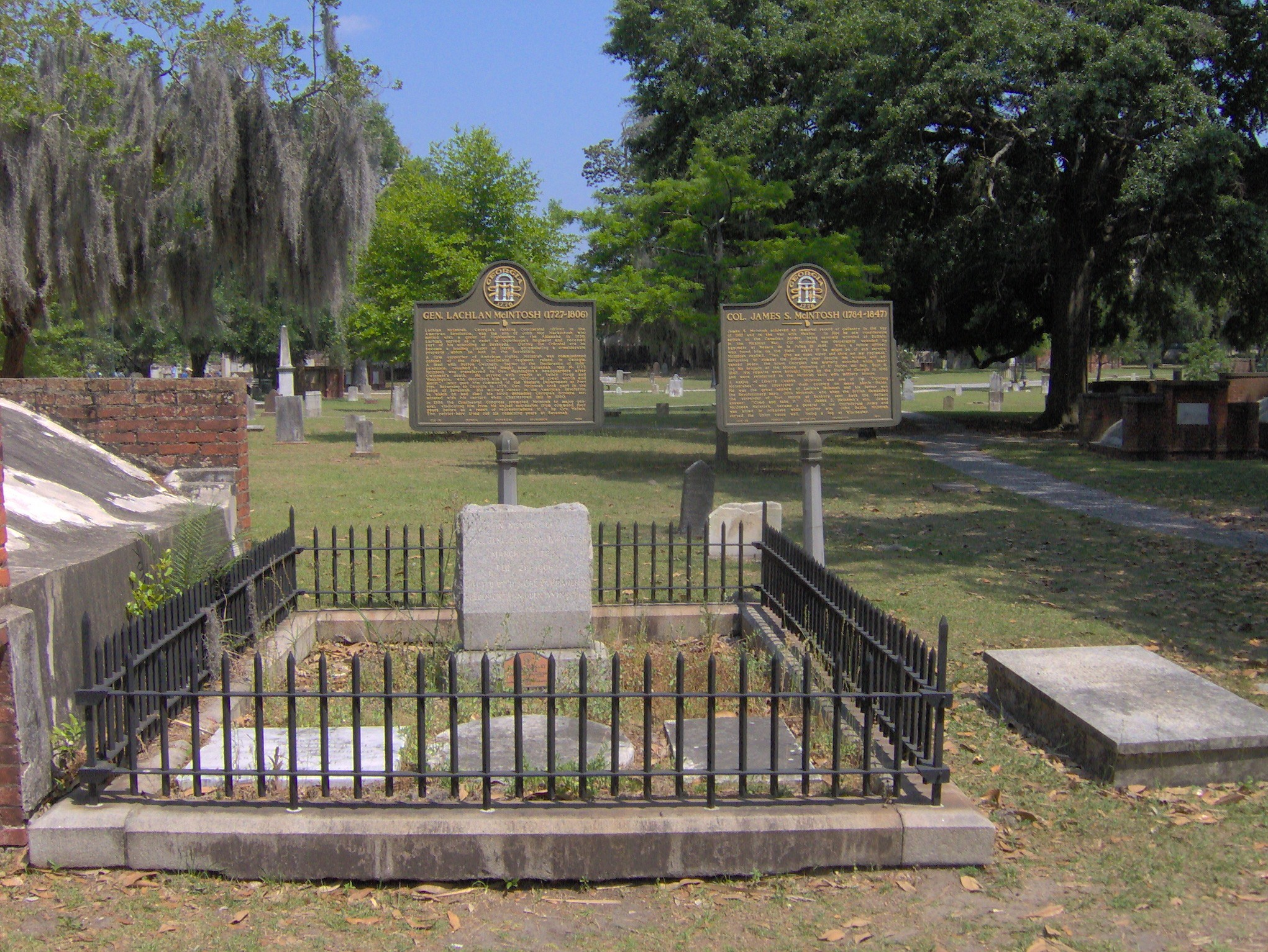
The grave of Lachlan McIntosh

- James Johnston (1738–1808), first printer in the Province of Georgia
- Edward Malbone (1777–1807), painter
- Lachlan McIntosh (1725–1806), major general in the Continental Army
- James Morrison (1789–1831), mayor of Savannah
- William Scarbrough, (1776–1838), sea captain

More than 700 victims of Savannah's 1820 yellow fever epidemic are also buried here.

The remains of major general Nathanael Greene (1742–1786) reposed in the cemetery's Graham vault between 1786 and 1901, at which point they were reinterred in Johnson Square, along with the remains of his eldest son, George. His remains had shared the vault with those of John Maitland, his arch-rival in the Revolutionary War. Maitland's remains were returned to his native Scotland in 1981.
