= Button Gwinnett =

American Founding Father and politician

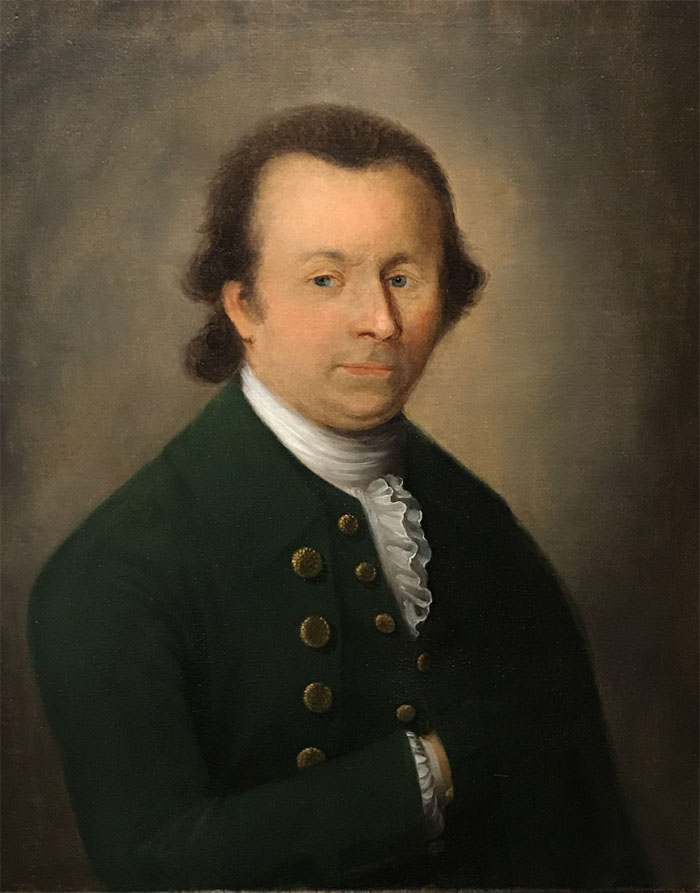
- Portrait attributed to Jeremiah Theus

8th Governor of Georgia
- In office February 22, 1777 – May 8, 1777
- Preceded by: Archibald Bulloch
- Succeeded by: John Adam Treutlen

Member of the Continental Congress from Georgia
- In office 1776–1777

Personal details
- Born: March 3, 1735 Gloucester, England, Great Britain
- Died: May 19, 1777 (aged 42) near Savannah, Georgia, U.S.
- Spouse: Ann Bourne

Button Gwinnett (/ɡwɪˈnɛt/ gwin-ET; March 3, 1735 – May 19, 1777) was a British-born American Founding Father who, as a representative of Georgia to the Continental Congress, was one of the signers of the United States Declaration of Independence (first signature on the left). Gwinnett was briefly the provisional president of Georgia in 1777, and Gwinnett County (now a major suburb of metropolitan Atlanta) was named for him. He was named in honor of his mother’s cousin, Barbara Button, who became his godmother. Gwinnett was killed by a wound sustained in a duel against rival general Lachlan McIntosh following a dispute after a failed invasion of East Florida.

== Early life and education ==
Coat of Arms of Button Gwinnett

Button Gwinnett was born in 1735 in the city of Gloucester in England, to the Reverend Samuel Gwinnett, who was the vicar of Down Hatherley, Gloucestershire and his wife, Anne. He was the third of his parents' seven children, born after his older sister Anna Maria and his older brother Samuel. There are conflicting reports as to his exact birthdate, but he was baptized in St Catherine's Church in Gloucester on April 10, 1735. It is believed that he attended the College School, held in Gloucester Cathedral (now called The King's School) as did his older brother, but there is no surviving evidence to substantiate this. He started his career apprenticed to his uncle William Gwinnett, a greengrocer in the city of Bristol, then moved to Wolverhampton in Staffordshire in 1754 after obtaining a further apprenticeship with an ironmonger there named John Weston Smith. On 19 April 1757 he married Ann Bourne, daughter of a greengrocer, at St. Peter's Church, Wolverhampton. In 1762, the couple, who parented three daughters, departed Wolverhampton and emigrated to America.

Gwinnett's business activities took him from Newfoundland to Jamaica. Never very successful, he moved to Savannah, Georgia, in 1765, and opened a store. When that venture failed, he bought (on credit) St. Catherine's Island, as well as a large number of slaves, in order to attempt to become a planter. Though his planting activities were also unsuccessful, he did make a name for himself in local politics and was elected to the Provincial Assembly.

== Political career ==
Gwinnett did not become a strong advocate of colonial rights until 1775, when St. John's Parish, which encompassed his lands, threatened to secede from Georgia because of the colony's conservative response to the events of the times. During his tenure in the Assembly, Gwinnett's chief rival was Lachlan McIntosh, and Lyman Hall was his closest ally.

Gwinnett was appointed to represent Georgia at the Continental Congress, where he voted in favor of the American Declaration of Independence, adopted by Congress on July 2, 1776. He signed the famous parchment copy on August 2, 1776. After signing the Declaration, he was accompanied as far as to Virginia by Carter Braxton, another of the signers, carrying a proposed state constitution drawn up by President John Adams. During his service in the Continental Congress, Gwinnett was a candidate for a brigadier general position to lead the 1st Regiment in the Continental Army but lost out to McIntosh. The loss of the position to his rival embittered Gwinnett greatly.

Gwinnett served in the Georgia state legislature, and in 1777 he wrote the original draft of Georgia's first state constitution. He became Speaker of the Georgia Assembly, a position he held until the death of the President (Governor) of Georgia Archibald Bulloch. Gwinnett was elevated to the vacated position by the Assembly's Executive Council. In this position, he sought to undermine the leadership of McIntosh. Tensions between Gwinnett and McIntosh reached a boiling point when the General Assembly voted to approve Gwinnett's attack on British Florida in April 1777.

== Death ==
As acting Delegate of the Congress from Georgia and commander-in-chief of Georgia's military, Gwinnett was the superior of his rival McIntosh. Gwinnett had McIntosh's brother arrested and charged with treason. He also ordered McIntosh to lead an invasion of British-controlled East Florida, which failed. Gwinnett and McIntosh blamed each other for the defeat, and McIntosh publicly called Gwinnett "a scoundrel and lying rascal". Gwinnett then challenged McIntosh to a duel, which they fought on May 16, 1777, at a plantation owned by deposed Royal Governor James Wright. The two men exchanged pistol shots at twelve paces, and both were wounded. Gwinnett died of his wounds on May 19, 1777, and is believed to have been buried in Savannah's Colonial Park Cemetery. McIntosh, although wounded, recovered and went on to live until 1806. He was a tried for but acquitted of Gwinnett's death.

== Legacy ==
Gwinnett's autograph is highly sought by collectors as a result of a combination of the desire by many top collectors to acquire a complete set of autographs by all 56 signers of the U.S. Declaration of Independence, and the extreme rarity of the Gwinnett signature; there are 51 known examples, since Gwinnett was fairly obscure prior to signing the Declaration and died shortly afterward. Only ten of those are in private hands. A letter containing his signature sold for a record $51,000 in 1927; a record that stood for over 45 years. In 1979, a record $100,000 was paid for a receipt signed by Gwinnett.

Gwinnett County, Georgia, a suburban county outside Atlanta, is named after him and he is one of the three Georgia signers of the Declaration of Independence honored with the Signers Monument in Augusta.

SS Button Gwinnett was a Liberty ship launched 2 May 1943 and scrapped in 1968.

== References in popular culture ==
The 1932 film Washington Merry-Go-Round portrays a presumptive descendant of Button Gwinnett as a freshman congressman with a contrarian axe to grind, starring Lee Tracy and Constance Cummings.

The 1953 Isaac Asimov short story "Button, Button" concerns an attempt to obtain a genuine (and therefore valuable) signature of Gwinnett by means of a device that can move objects through time.

The 1958 film The Last Hurrah portrays a powerful mayor of an unnamed New England city undertaking one last, no-holds-barred mayoral campaign. In discussing the value of his signature, the mayor remarks "Oh, I'm afraid my signature will never become as rare as Button Gwinnett," explaining that he was "a colonial gentleman who apparently signed only one thing in his life: the Declaration of Independence."

Button Gwinnett is referenced several times in the Fallout video game series: in Fallout 3, there is a robot located in the National Archives Building who, due to a malfunction, believes himself to be the real Button Gwinnett. In Fallout 4, there is a brewery in Boston named after Gwinnett, serving as an in-game equivalent of the real-world Samuel Adams beer brand.

During a media tour to promote his 2015 musical Hamilton, Lin-Manuel Miranda performed a parody musical called “Button!” on The Late Show with Stephen Colbert. In it, Colbert plays Gwinnett as he engages in a rap battle with John Adams (played by Miranda).

== See also ==
- Memorial to the 56 Signers of the Declaration of Independence
- List of United States governors born outside the United States

Political offices
Preceded by Archibald Bulloch	Governor of Georgia; 1777	Succeeded by John Adam Treutlen
