= Placentia Plantation =

Former plantation in Savannah, Georgia

- Interactive map of the Placentia Plantation area

General information
- Location: Savannah, Georgia, U.S.
- Coordinates: 32.02685570°N 81.060990°W

Placentia Plantation was a plantation founded in the 18th century near colonial Savannah, Province of Georgia, around 3.5 miles (5.6 km) southeast of the city and a short distance west of the Wilmington River. Until emancipation, the plantation was worked by black slaves.

Josiah Tattnall Jr., son of founding father of Savannah Josiah Tattnall Sr., inherited the plantation in 1781. He was born at nearby Bonaventure Plantation. In 1786, Tattnall sold 850 acres (340 ha) of Plancentia to John McQueen.

William Hughes, after surveying the land, divided the property into twelve equal parcels, each containing 65 acres (26 ha). The plots ran from Skidaway Road to the marshes at the Wilmington River.

Since 1891, Savannah State University has stood partly on the plantation's colored cemetery, a 2.5 acres (1.0 ha) burial site containing many unmarked graves.

In the early 19th century, John Postell Williamson began cultivating the land for rice, cotton and corn.

In 2018, construction on a memorial garden for the colored graveyard was begun at Savannah State University.

Placentia Canal flows north through the area and empties into the Wilmington River across from Richardson Creek. It was constructed between 1877 and 1887.

== In popular culture ==
The plantation is mentioned in Big Auntie's Pearls, a 2021 novel by Hope Gregory.
