= Bonaventure Plantation =

Former plantation in Savannah, Georgia

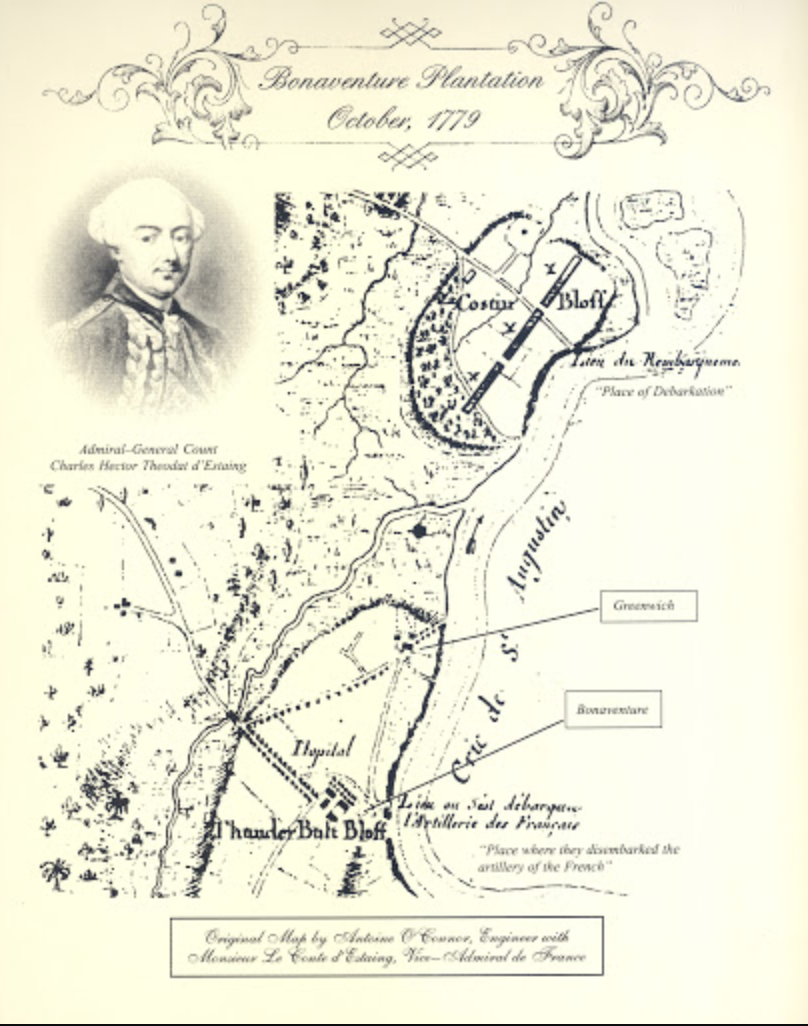
- An October 1779 map by Antoine O'Connor, chief engineer of French Admiral-General Charles Henri Hector d'Estaing, showing the location of Bonaventure
- Interactive map of the Bonaventure Plantation area

General information
- Location: Colonial Savannah, Province of Georgia
- Coordinates: 32.0435°N 81.0451°W
- Completed: 1762; rebuilt after 1771
- Destroyed: 1771 (fire); 1804 (fire)
- Owner: 1762–c. 1764 John Mullryne; c. 1764–1782 Josiah Tattnall Sr.; 1782–1788 John Habersham; 1788–1803 Josiah Tattnall Jr.; 1817–1819 Edward Tattnall, Harriet Tattnall & Josiah Tattnall III; 1819–1832 Edward Tattnall & Josiah Tattnall III; 1832–1846 Josiah Tattnall III; 1846–1853 Peter Wiltberger; 1853–1907 William Wiltberger

Bonaventure Plantation was a plantation founded in colonial Savannah, Province of Georgia, on land now occupied by Greenwich and Bonaventure cemeteries. The site was 600 acres (2.4 km^{2}), including a plantation house and private cemetery, located on the Wilmington River, about 3.5 miles (6 kilometres) east of the Savannah colony.

== History ==
The plantation was founded in 1762 by British Army colonel John Mullryne, who had emigrated from Montserrat to Charleston, South Carolina, initially, before moving south to Savannah.

"The high ground, an extended river view, etc., made it one of the choicest sites near the city of Savannah and the first house was erected at that time, facing the center walk of the old garden," wrote Charles Colcock Jones Jr. in 1890. "This garden extended in terraces from the plateau to the river."

The property fell into the possession of the Tattnall family after Josiah Tattnall Sr. (b. February 8, 1740), of Charleston, married Mary, the youngest daughter of John and Claudia Mullryne. Josiah and Mary's second son, Josiah Tattnall Jr., was born at the plantation.

Per Claudia Mullryne's will and testament, dated December 10, 1781, her daughter, Catharine Moore, a widow, was left "the mansion house called Bonaventure where she now resides." Upon Catharine's death, John and Claudia's grandson, the above-mentioned John Tattnall, would inherit the mansion, as well as "six hundred acres of land adjoining those of Josiah Tattnall." Josiah was also given a plantation called Placentia, adjoining Thunderbolt. Granddaughter Claudia Cattell Tattnall was deeded the "slaves etc."

The first house, made of English brick, was destroyed by a fire on January 7, 1771. John Berendt wrote in his 1994 book Midnight in the Garden of Good and Evil that a formal dinner party, held by either John Mullryne or Josiah Tattnall Sr., was in progress when one of the servants informed the host that the roof was ablaze and that nothing could be done to stop it. The host "rose calmly, clinked his glass, and invited guests to pick up their dinner plates and follow him into the garden", where they ate the remainder of their meals in the glow of the flames. The house was replaced by a brick mansion.

When Savannahians ousted and arrested royal governor James Wright in February 1776, John Mullryne and Josiah Tattnall aided his escape through Bonaventure to HMS Scarborough, a British naval vessel nearby.

In 1779 the mansion was used as a hospital during the siege of Savannah.

After the Mullryne and Tattnall actions in support of the Crown six years earlier, the Bonaventure estate was confiscated by the Revolutionary government in 1782 and sold at public auction to John Habersham, a friend of the Tattnalls, who sold the property in 1788 to Josiah Tattnall Jr., who had married two years earlier. His wife, Harriet (née Fenwick), gave birth to three children who lived to adulthood: Edward (1788–1832), Harriet (d. 1819) and Josiah III (1795–1871).

John Mullryne, who, along with Josiah Tattnall Sr., had fled the colonies during the Revolutionary War, died on January 6, 1786, in Nassau, Bahamas.

Around 1785, Josiah Tattnall Jr. returned to Savannah and eventually bought back the Bonaventure property from John Habersham.

Harriet died in 1802 and was buried at the plantation beside her five children who died in infancy: Mary, Claudia, Josiah, John and Sally. Josiah Jr. died in 1803, a year after his wife, while in the Bahamas. The orphaned children were raised in London, England, by their grandfather.

The mansion was destroyed, by another fire, in 1804.

In 1817, Josiah Tattnall Jr.’s children reclaimed their family's lands. After his sister's death in 1819 and his brother's in 1832, Bonaventure passed solely to Josiah III. He had joined the United States Navy in 1812 and fought in the Mexican–American War.

The estate remained in the Tattnall family until 1846, when Captain Peter Wiltberger (1791–1853) became the new owner. The sale excluded the Tattnall family cemetery, but Wiltberger agreed to maintain it.

Wiltberger died while in Brooklyn, New York, shortly after purchasing Bonaventure and was buried at the estate beside his wife, Susan (1788–1849), and their son, Rutherford (1827–1932). Another son, Major William Henry Wiltberger (1825–1872), inherited the property. After fighting in the Civil War, in which he attained the rank of Major, he fulfilled his father's desire to turn part of Bonaventure into a public cemetery by forming Evergreen Cemetery Company on June 12, 1868. Bonaventure came under the control of said company. Major Wiltberger died in 1872 and was buried next to his family in section B, lot 3 of the cemetery he helped create.

After the death of William, all titles to Bonaventure and the cemetery tracts were transferred to the Evergreen Cemetery Company by the executors of his estate. The Evergreen Cemetery of Bonaventure was bought by the city of Savannah on July 7, 1907, for $30,000. Greenwich Cemetery became an addition to Bonaventure in 1933.

== Bonaventure Cemetery ==
The following notable members of the Tattnall family are buried in today's Bonaventure Cemetery, on Mullryne Way: Adjacent to the north is section F, which is known as Plantation Square, presumably where the mansion formerly stood.

- Harriet Tattnall (1769–1802), plot 11
- Josiah Tattnall Jr. (1764–1803), plot 14
- Edward Tattnall (1788–1832), plot 10
- Josiah Tattnall III (1795–1871),

No Mullrynes are known to buried at either Bonaventure or Greenwich cemeteries.
