= Patrick Graham (governor) =

Colonial Governor of the state of Georgia (died 1755)

Governor of Georgia
- In office 1752–1754
- Monarch: George II
- Preceded by: Henry Parker
- Succeeded by: John Reynolds

Personal details
- Died: May 30, 1755
- Spouse: Ann Cuthbert (m. 1740)
- Profession: Surgeon, planter, governor

Patrick Graham (died May 30, 1755) was the last proprietary governor of the Province of Georgia, serving from 1752 until 1754.

== Biography ==
Patrick Graham was originally a surgeon by trade but did not practice much after arriving in Georgia. Graham was in a medical capacity, however, when he recommended to Ann Cuthbert that the cure to her high fever was to marry him. Mrs. Cuthbert and Graham were married in 1740 on the plantation of her deceased brother, John Cuthbert. Graham took control of John's plantation that Ann inherited after he died and continued to cultivate it with silkworms, giving it the name Mulberry Grove. When the ban on slavery was lifted in Georgia, Graham began to primarily grow rice using enslaved laborers. The plantation would later be owned by Major General Nathanael Greene, and was the location where Eli Whitney invented the cotton gin.

In 1745, Graham was appointed to a council with two other future colonial governors of Georgia: William Stephens and Henry Parker. Following the death of Henry Parker as governor in 1752, Graham became the third and final proprietary governor of Georgia. The British parliament had already decided to make Georgia a royal colony governed by a royal governor, so Graham acted as a temporary leader until the royal governor could be selected. While serving as governor, Graham planned a settlement in Hardwick, Bryan County, Georgia named Georgetown in honor of reining monarch George II.

In 1754, Royal Navy officer John Reynolds became royal governor of Georgia, and Graham was appointed as head advisor of the King’s Council with nine other members. Graham continued to serve on that council until his death on May 30, 1755. He left most of his property to his family in Scotland and to Mrs. Cuthbert.
