= Georgia Loyalists =

- Active: 1779-1783
- Country: Great Britain
- Allegiance: British Army
- Type: British provincial unit, (auxiliary troops)
- Size: ?
- Garrison/HQ: Savannah, Colony of Georgia
- Engagements: American Revolutionary War: Siege of Savannah

Commanders
- Notable commanders: Major James Wright

The Georgia Loyalists were a British provincial military unit, raised for Loyalist service during the American Revolutionary War. They were raised in August 1779 to provide a permanent garrison for the city of Savannah, with enlisted men contracted for two years service or upon the war's end. Its only commanding officer was Major James Wright, son of Governor Sir James Wright. The Georgia Loyalists fought during the Siege of Savannah that same year, during which Captain Simpson was killed on 8 October. As conditions in the Southern Theatre rapidly deteriorated following the Siege of Yorktown, the Georgia Loyalists were merged into the King's Carolina Rangers.
