= Governor Parker =

Governor Parker may refer to:

- David Stuart Parker (1919–1990), 16th Governor of the Panama Canal Zone
- Henry Parker (Georgia official) (1690–1777), Colonial Governor of Georgia from 1751 until 1752
- Joel Parker (politician) (1816–1888), 20th Governor of New Jersey
- John Frederick Parker (United States Navy) (1853–1911), Governor of American Samoa from 1908 to 1910
- John M. Parker (1863–1939), 37th Governor of Louisiana
