= Governor Reynolds =

Governor Reynolds may refer to:

- John Reynolds (Royal Navy officer) (c. 1713–1788), 5th Colonial Governor of Georgia from 1754 to 1757
- John W. Reynolds Jr. (1921–2002), 36th Governor of Wisconsin
- John Reynolds (Illinois politician) (1788–1865), 4th Governor of Illinois
- Kim Reynolds (born 1959), 43rd Governor of Iowa
- Robert J. Reynolds (1838–1909), 47th Governor of Delaware
- Thomas Reynolds (governor) (1796–1844), 7th Governor of Missouri
- Thomas Caute Reynolds (1821–1887), Confederate Governor of Missouri from 1862 to 1865
