= John Mullryne =

English soldier (d. 1786)

John Mullryne (died 6 January 1786) was a British Army colonel who established Bonaventure Plantation in Savannah, Province of Georgia, in 1761. A supporter of the Crown, he later drew the ire of the colonists after aiding (with the help of his son-in-law Josiah Tattnall Sr.) the escape of James Wright, the British royal governor of the Province of Georgia, through his property during the American Revolutionary War.

== Early life ==
Mullryne was born in Montserrat in the Windward Islands but emigrated to Beaufort, South Carolina, where he became a successful merchant. He married Claudia Cattell on 23 October 1735 in Montserrat. Their youngest daughter, Mary (1741–1781), married Josiah Tattnall Sr. They had another daughter, Catharine. (Lucian Lamar Knight, in his 1913 book Georgia's Landmarks, Memorials and Legends, states that Mary was the couple's only child.)

In 1762, around a year after purchasing the land that became Bonaventure Plantation, Mullryne had built a plantation house for his family on the property. The first house, made of English brick, was destroyed by a fire on 7 January 1771. John Berendt wrote in his 1994 book Midnight in the Garden of Good and Evil that a formal dinner party, held by either Mullryne or Tattnall, was in progress when one of the servants informed the host that the roof was ablaze and that nothing could be done to stop it. The host "rose calmly, clinked his glass, and invited guests to pick up their dinner plates and follow him into the garden", where they ate the remainder of their meals in the glow of the flames. The house was replaced by a brick mansion. By the end of 1771, Mullryne and Tattnall owned around 10,000 acres (4,000 ha) of land in Georgia.

In February 1776, during the early stages of the Revolutionary War, Mullryne and Tattnall declared their loyalty to George III by assisting in the escape to Cockspur Island of Georgia's newly ousted royal governor, James Wright, to the HMS Scarborough by way of their land in Thunderbolt. For this, the pair had the Bonaventure estate confiscated by the Revolutionary government in 1782 and sold at public auction to John Habersham, a friend of the Tattnalls, who sold the property in 1788 to Josiah Tattnall Jr., who had married two years earlier.

Mullryne and Tattnall fled the colonies and were told never to return, or face death.

== Death ==
Mullryne died on 6 January 1786 in Nassau, Bahamas. His burial location, if there was one, is unknown, but it is understood that no Mullryne is buried in either Bonaventure Cemetery or Greenwich Cemetery; there is a Mullryne Way in the former cemetery, however.
