= Jonathan Bryan =

American patriot

- Born: September 7, 1708; Pocotaligo, South Carolina
- Died: March 9, 1788 (aged 79); Savannah, Georgia, U.S.
- Resting place: Laurel Grove Cemetery, Savannah, Georgia, U.S.
- Spouse: Mary Williamson (–1781; her death)

Jonathan Bryan (September 7, 1708 – March 9, 1788) was an American patriot originally from South Carolina but who moved Savannah, Georgia, where he assisted James Edward Oglethorpe in the foundation of Georgia's first colony. He also held several political offices in Georgia, and was a large landowner.

Georgia's Bryan County was named for him, while Savannah's Bryan Street was named in his and his brothers' honor.

== Life and career ==
Bryan was born in 1708 in Pocotaligo, South Carolina, to Joseph Bryan and Janet Cochran. His brothers were middle son Hugh and the oldest Joseph Jr. The brothers' sister was Hannah, born in 1706. Bryan's father, Joseph Sr., was an Englishman from Hereford. His mother died three weeks after his birth.

In 1779, during the Revolutionary War, he and his son were captured and imprisoned on Long Island for two years.

He served as a member of the Provincial Congress and of the Council of Safety. He was also acting vice-president and commander-in-chief of Georgia in 1777.

He was a supporter of George Whitefield, himself a supporter of slavery. Bryan's "treatment of [his] slaves with a respect ordinarily denied them may have contributed to the great success of his plantations."

Bryan was the grandfather of Joseph Bryan.

== Death ==
Bryan died in 1788, aged 79. He was buried in the Brampton Plantation cemetery; he is entombed in a brick vault in its south-west corner, alongside his wife. During the Civil War, Union Army soldiers raided his grave, looking for valuables they believed were hidden by locals.

=== Legacy ===
Bryan Street in Savannah was named in his and his brothers' honor. Bryan County, Georgia, was named solely for him. A historical marker, erected by the Georgia Historical Society, stands in Savannah's Franklin Square, in front of the First African Baptist Church.

== See also ==
- John Postell Williamson
