= USS Tattnall (DD-125) =

Wickes-class destroyer

Coordinates: 49.6526°N 124.9499°W

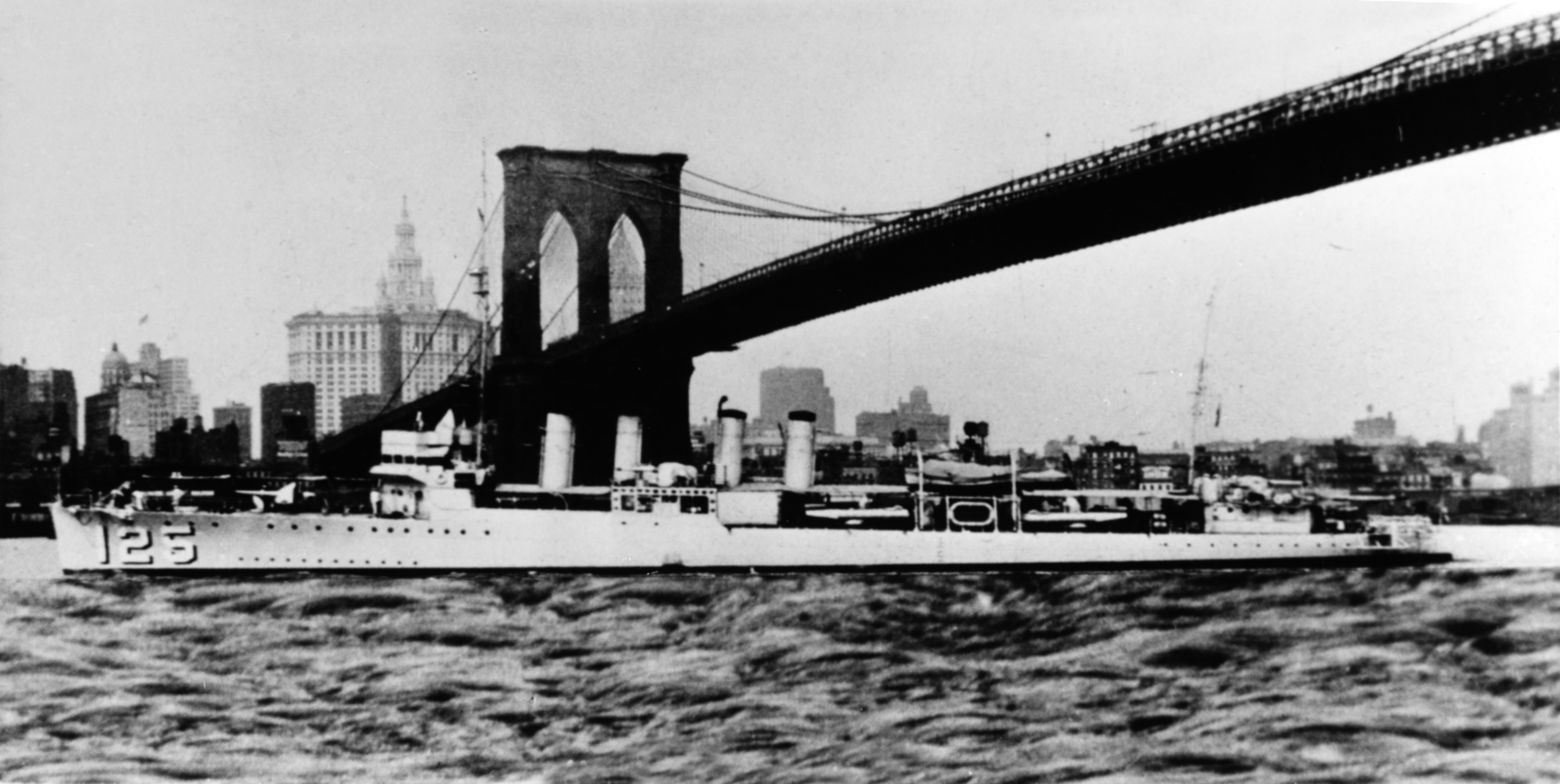
- USS Tattnall (DD-125)

History

United States
- Namesake: Josiah Tattnall III
- Builder: New York Shipbuilding Corporation, Camden, New Jersey
- Laid down: 1 December 1917
- Launched: 5 September 1918
- Commissioned: 26 June 1919
- Decommissioned: 15 June 1922
- Recommissioned: 1 May 1930
- Decommissioned: 17 December 1945
- Reclassified: APD-19 on 24 July 1943
- Stricken: 8 January 1946
- Fate: Sold for scrap, 17 October 1946

General characteristics
- Class & type: Wickes-class destroyer
- Displacement: 1,090 tons
- Length: 314 ft 4 1/2 in (95.822 m)
- Beam: 30 ft 11 1/4 in (9.430 m)
- Draft: 9 ft 4 in (2.84 m)
- Speed: 35 knots (65 km/h)
- Complement: 122 officers and enlisted
- Armament: 4 × 4 in (102 mm)/50 guns, 2 × 3 in (76 mm)/23 guns, 12 × 21 inch (533 mm) torpedo tubes

USS Tattnall (DD–125) was a Wickes-class destroyer in the United States Navy during World War II. She was the first ship named for Captain Josiah Tattnall III.

Tattnall was laid down at Camden, New Jersey, on 1 December 1917 by the New York Shipbuilding Corporation; launched on 5 September 1918; sponsored by Miss Sarah Campbell Kollock; and commissioned on 26 June 1919.

== Service history ==
Following trials off the New England coast, Tattnall sailed for the eastern Mediterranean. She arrived at Constantinople on 27 July and, for almost a year, operated in Turkish waters. During that time, she also visited ports in Egypt, Greece, Russia, and Syria transporting passengers and mail. In June 1920, the destroyer began her return voyage to the United States. During the voyage home, she was designated DD-125 on 17 July 1920 when the Navy adopted the alphanumeric system of 125 designations. She stopped at ports in Italy and France before entering New York harbor on 22 July. Following overhaul, Tattnall put to sea to join the Pacific Fleet. After port calls along the southern coast of the United States and at ports in Cuba, Nicaragua, Mexico, and the Panama Canal Zone, she reached San Diego on 17 December. The warship operated along the California coast until 15 June 1922, when she was decommissioned and placed in reserve at San Diego.

On 1 May 1930, Tattnall was recommissioned. The warship served with the Battle Force along the west coast until 1931. By 1 July of that year, she had been transferred to the United States East Coast for duty with the Scouting Force Destroyers as a unit of Destroyer Division 7.

A year later, Tattnall's activity was curtailed by her assignment to the rotating reserve. On 1 January 1934, the destroyer resumed a more active role with the Fleet when she began a year of duty with the Scouting Force Training Squadron. Following another period of relative inactivity in rotating reserve, she rejoined the Training Squadron late in 1935. During the latter part of 1937, the Training Detachment, United States Fleet, was established; and Tattnall and the other units of the Scouting Force Training Squadron joined the new organization. The destroyer continued her training duties until November 1938.

=== World War II ===
On 17 November 1938, she and J. Fred Talbott relieved Dallas and Babbitt as units of the Special Service Squadron. Tattnall was based in the Canal Zone until the squadron was disbanded on 17 September 1940. The warship, however, continued to operate in the Gulf of Mexico and Caribbean Sea out of her home port at Panama. After the United States entered World War II, Tattnall began escorting coastwise convoys in her area of operations, frequently through the Windward Passage between Cuba and Hispaniola, a dangerous area during the height of the Caribbean U-boat blitz. Though she made many sonar contacts and depth charge attacks, Tattnall registered no confirmed kills.

Early in July 1943, the destroyer escorted her last Caribbean convoy north from the Windward Passage to Charleston, South Carolina. She arrived on the 10th, began conversion to a high-speed transport at the navy yard, and was redesignated APD-19 on 24 July. On 6 September 1943, the day following the 25th anniversary of her launching, Tattnall completed conversion. She finished her shakedown cruise in mid-September. Following post-shakedown repairs and alterations in late September, the high-speed transport began amphibious training—first, at Cove Point, Maryland, and later, at Fort Pierce, Florida.

In April 1944, Tattnall was designated flagship of Transport Division (TransDiv) 13, the only high-speed transport division in the Atlantic theater. On 13 April, she departed the U.S. East Coast for Oran, Algeria, in company with Roper, Barry, Greene, and Osmond Ingram. TransDiv 13 joined the 8th Fleet at the end of April, and Tattnall moved to Corsica to practice for her first assignment, the capture of Elba and Pianosa Islands in the Tyrrhenian Sea. However, before the invasion and during her training period, Tattnall was called upon to feign a landing near Civitavecchia, Italy, north of Rome, to draw off German reinforcements headed south to turn back the American forces breaking through at Monte Cassino and heading for Rome. The ruse apparently worked. The reinforcements never reached Monte Cassino; and, on the following day, German radio announced an Allied invasion north of Rome.

On 17 June, the invasion troops went ashore on Elba and Pianosa. Tattnall's boats came under machine gun fire, but suffered no serious damage. After the landings in the Tyrrhenian Sea, the high-speed transport began convoy duty between Italian, Sicilian, and North African ports. Following that duty, she resumed amphibious operations, this time with members of the American-Canadian 1st Special Service Force embarked. Their mission was to capture the heavily fortified Hyeres Islands, located just east of Toulon, and hold them during the main landings in the invasion of southern France. On 15 August, the five ships of TransDiv 13 rapidly put 1,600 troops ashore, and the islands were secured within three days. During the next two weeks, Tattnall and her sister transports shuttled reinforcements and supplies into southern France and evacuated Allied wounded and German prisoners of war. For the remainder of the year, the high-speed transport escorted convoys between ports in the Mediterranean Sea.

Tattnall returned to the United States at Norfolk on 21 December and began a month-long availability period before heading for the Pacific. She got underway from Hampton Roads on 31 January 1945. After transiting the Panama Canal early in February and making stops at San Diego, Pearl Harbor, Eniwetok, and Ulithi, the fast transport reached the Okinawa area on 19 April.

The high-speed transport remained in the Ryukyus through the end of the month. During that time, she stood guard on several of the screen stations which circled Okinawa to protect the units of the fleet from attack by kamikazes. Tattnall fired at enemy planes several times in the days preceding the night of 29 April and 30 April.

Three red alerts before 0200 failed to materialize into enemy attacks. However, at about 0215, bogies began closing in from the west. A twin-engined plane crossed Tattnall's stern from about 3,000 yards, and her 40 mm gun crews opened fire. The attacker retired to her starboard quarter with one engine ablaze, only to renew its attack. This time, her gunners finished the job they had begun on its first pass, and it crashed into the sea. Soon thereafter, a kamikaze approached the warship from starboard. Tattnall, her engines at full speed, turned hard to port to evade the attacker. It splashed down close to her starboard bow. Debris rained down on Tattnall and pierced her above the waterline, but she suffered neither casualties nor serious damage.

The following day, Tattnall departed Okinawa and headed for the Mariana Islands and convoy escort duty. She arrived at Saipan on 3 May and returned with a convoy to Okinawa on the 20th. The warship resumed picket duty but experienced no more action like that of the night of 29 April and 30 April. To be sure, her crew stood long watches and, on 25 May, was at general quarters for 18 hours straight. On that day, Barry and Roper were hit by kamikazes. Barry later sank, and Roper was sent to a rear area for repairs.

Early in June, Tattnall was ordered to report for duty with the Philippine Sea Frontier. She stopped at Saipan on 13 June and reached Leyte on the 17th. Through the end of the war and for almost a month thereafter, she conducted patrols in the Philippines and escorted convoys to Ulithi and Hollandia. On 13 September, Tattnall headed back to the United States. After stops at Eniwetok and Pearl Harbor, the fast transport arrived in San Francisco on 30 October.

From there, she was routed north to the Puget Sound Navy Yard and disposition by the Commandant, 13th Naval District. Tattnall was decommissioned at Puget Sound on 17 December 1945. Her name was struck from the Navy list on 8 January 1946. She was sold to the Pacific Metal Salvage Company, of Seattle, Washington, on 17 October 1946 and scrapped. Her hull was towed to Royston, British Columbia and beached as part of a breakwater, parts of her hull are still visible in 2009.

== Awards ==
Tattnall received three battle stars for her World War II service.
