= USS Tattnall =

USS Tattnall may refer to the following ships of the United States Navy:

- USS Tattnall (DD-125), a Wickes-class destroyer launched in 1918; converted to a high-speed transport and redesignated APD-19 in 1943; struck in 1946
- USS Tattnall (DDG-19), a Charles F. Adams-class guided missile destroyer launched in 1961 and struck in 1993
