= List of colonial governors of Georgia =

This is of the governors of the Province of Georgia from 1732 until 1782, including the restored Loyalist administration during the War of American Independence.

#	Image	Name	Title	Term start	Term end	Notes
–		James Oglethorpe	Resident Trustee	9 June 1732	1743	
1		William Stephens	President	1743	8 April 1751	First governor
2		Henry Parker	President	8 April 1751	23 June 1752	
3		Patrick Graham	President	23 June 1752	21 June 1754	
4		John Reynolds	Governor	29 October 1754	1757	First royal governor
5		Henry Ellis	Governor	17 May 1758	November 1760	
6		James Wright	Governor	November 1760	11 February 1776	
Interregnum under revolutionary control from 1776 until 1778; see List of governors of Georgia
(7)		Sir Archibald Campbell	Governor	29 December 1778	July 1779	Head of military administration
(8)		Jacques Prevost	Provisional governor	July 1779	September 1779	
(9)		James Wright	Governor	September 1779	11 July 1782	
