= Pocotaligo, South Carolina =

- Location within South Carolina Location within the United States
- Coordinates: 32°38′14″N 80°51′48″W
- Country: United States
- State: South Carolina
- County: Jasper
- Elevation: 13 ft (4 m)
- ZIP code: 29445
- Area codes: 843, 854

Pocotaligo is an unincorporated community located in northeastern Jasper County, South Carolina, United States, close to the border of Beaufort County. The community takes its name from the Pocotaligo River, a small tidal creek that separates Jasper and Beaufort counties. Although historically significant, Pocotaligo today primarily serves as a junction point between U.S. Highway 17, U.S. Highway 17 Alternate and U.S. Highway 21. These roads lead to Interstate 95 at Point South and Yemassee, which have over time eclipsed Pocotaligo in population and importance. Very few people live in the community today.

== History ==
=== Colonial ===
In colonial times, Pocotaligo was one of several villages for the Upper Yamasee tribe. As colonial development of Beaufort and the surrounding Lowcountry began to expand, tensions escalated between settlers and several Creek tribes. The colonial government sent a party of six to Pocotaligo to ask for Yamasee assistance in negotiating with the Creeks. However, the Yamasee decided on the night after the party's proposal to attack the party, killing four of the six men. That event launched the start of the Yamasee War, the most serious challenge to colonial rule in South Carolina's history. Pocotaligo was eventually taken over by settlers, who established a bridge over the creek and allowed the community to be an important stop along the overland route between Charleston and Savannah.

=== Civil War ===
Prior to the Civil War, Pocotaligo became an important stop on the Charleston and Savannah Railway, with a depot located about one mile northwest of the settlement. When hostilities began in 1861 and the Federal capture of the Beaufort area in the Battle of Port Royal, control of the railway became an objective in disrupting the Confederate economy. Pocotaligo was the closest depot to Port Royal Island and was a sought-after target for Union troops to disrupt rail service. For a short time in 1862, General Robert E. Lee was assigned to South Carolina to protect the railway, establish defensive units, and prevent Union incursion onto the mainland from the Sea Islands. Periodic raids were attempted by Union forces to attack the railway at Pocotaligo, of which, the most serious one was deflected in October 1862. Pocotaligo fell to General William Tecumseh Sherman in early 1865 shortly after his army's capture of Savannah in Christmas 1864.

=== Post Civil War ===
Pocotaligo's status as a rail depot declined shortly after the Port Royal Railroad was finished in 1870 with Yemassee as its established junction depot with the Charleston and Savannah Railway. The creation of U.S. Highway 17 in the 1930s brought some economic vitality back to the community for a few decades, but the opening on Interstate 95 and the creation of Point South as a travelers' commercial center brought further economic decline. Beyond a few historic markers and residences, very little of the community remains today.

== Transportation ==
The western intersection of U.S. Highway 17 with U.S. Highway 21 is located in Pocotaligo. Interstate 95 is located one mile to the west at Point South.

== Notable people ==
- Jonathan Bryan, landowner who assisted James Edward Oglethorpe in the formation of the colony of Savannah, Georgia
- John Postell Williamson, mayor of Savannah

== See also ==
- Yamasee War
- Battle of Port Royal
