= Chasseurs-Volontaires de Saint-Domingue =

French colonial regiment, 1779–1783

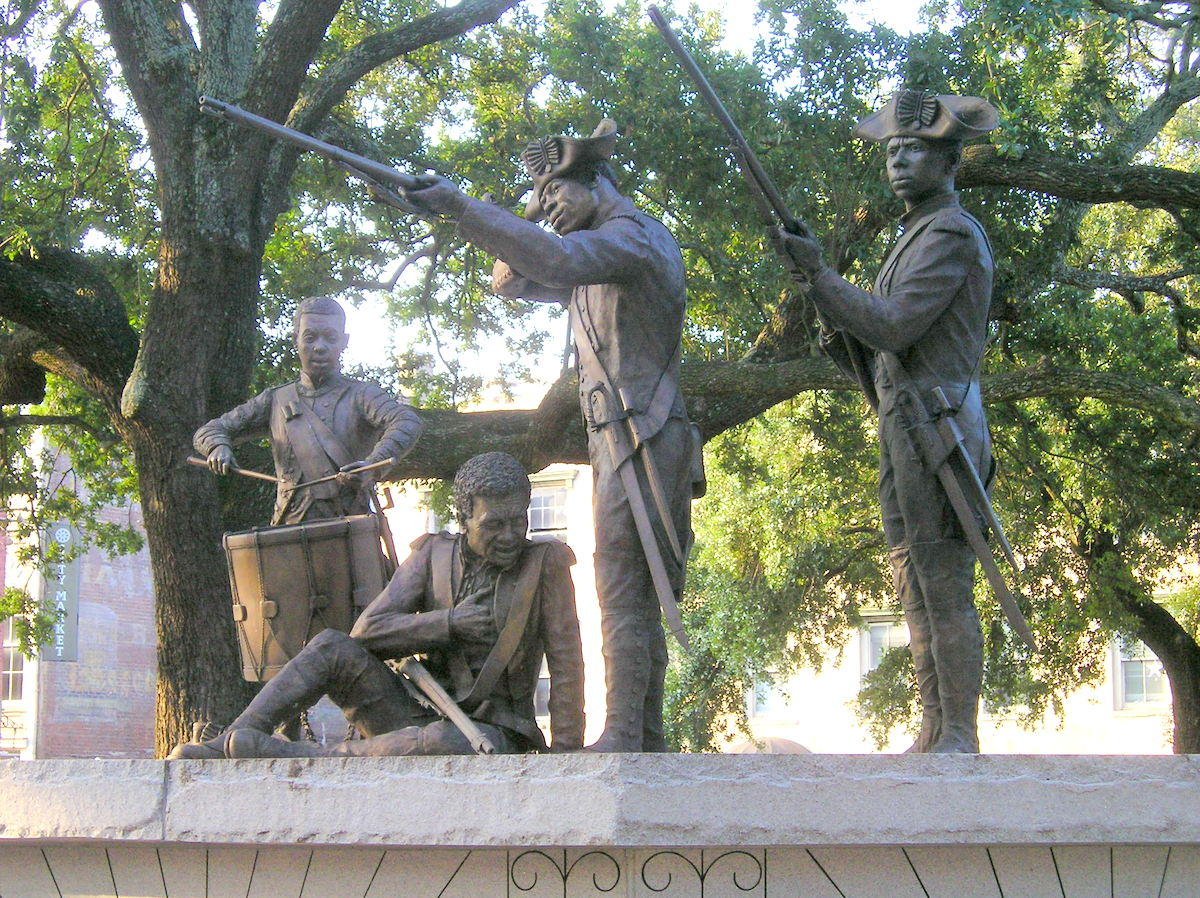
A monument to the regiment in Savannah, Georgia

Chasseurs-Volontaires de Saint-Domingue (French pronunciation: [ʃasœʁ vɔlɔ̃tɛʁ də sɛ̃ dɔmɛ̃ɡ], lit. 'Volunteer Chasseurs of Saint-Domingue') was a line infantry regiment raised in the French colony of Saint-Domingue on 12 March 1779. Though the regiment was for non-whites, the officers were white, with the exception of Laurent François Lenoir, Marquis de Rouvray, who commanded the regiment. (Note: de Rouvray was a black marquis who served with the French in Canada in 1768 where he was promoted to the rank of Colonel. He died in 1798 in Philadelphia, Pennsylvania, after many personal battles due to American disrespect for a black French marquis. He was listed in the Dictionnaire des gens de couleur dans la France moderne as a black man living in France.) The regiment was disbanded in 1783.

== Establishment ==
Originally, the regiment was to consist of 10 companies of light infantry organized into two battalions, each company consisting of 79 men. It was open to all gens de couleur, not just free blacks of mixed race, but also slaves who were promised their freedom on their return if they joined. On 21 April 1779, the regiment received authorization for an expansion. Each of the companies would now number 100 gens de couleur, plus three white officers. The enlisted men comprised 88 fusiliers, two drummers, eight corporals, four sergeants, and one "fourrier". The regimental officers, all white, consisted of a colonel, a lieutenant-colonel, a battalion commandant, a major, and an aide-major.

== Siege of Savannah ==
The regiment accompanied the Comte d'Estaing as part of the expeditionary force for service in the American Revolutionary War. The unit was plagued by desertions but still some 545 men participated in the Siege of Savannah. The white counterpart to the Chasseurs, the Grenadiers-Volontiers, nominally a battalion-sized unit and even more plagued by desertions, provided 156 men.

The expeditionary force under the command of d'Estaing and his lieutenant, Jean-Baptiste Bernard Vaublanc, left Cap-Français on 15 August 1779, and arrived on 8 September 1779, in Savannah, Georgia. After arriving they were tasked to help the American colonial rebels, who were intent on regaining control of the city which British forces under Lieutenant-Colonel Archibald Campbell had captured in 1778. An official list of the units participating in the siege mentioned both the Chasseurs-Volontaires and the Grenadier-Volontiers, but mentioned that they were only to be used to dig trenches.

The British Army sortied from their defenses on 24 September before dawn to engage their French and American besiegers. The Chasseurs fought back and lost one man while seven others were wounded, along with Conte D'Estaing. The siege ended in failure on 9 October 1779.

Pierre L'Enfant, who eventually would design Washington, D.C., was also wounded in the battle while serving in American Lieutenant Colonel John Laurens' light infantry.

Twelve-year old slave-boy Henri Christophe, who served as a drummer, would later become the King of Haiti.

== Subsequent service ==
The French did not disband the Chasseurs, but instead continued to use the unit. Some men accompanied d'Estaing and Rouvray to Versailles; these Chasseurs did not return to Saint-Domingue until 1780. The majority of the regiment then served in Saint-Domingue as garrison troops.

A company of 62 men accompanied the casualties from Savannah to Charleston and then participated in the defense of Charleston in spring 1780.

A third of the regiment, some 150 to 200 men, were stationed in Grenada. As late as mid-1782 about 100 were still there.

== Legacy ==
In 2007, a memorial sculpture was dedicated to the Chasseurs-Volontaires de Saint-Domingue in Savannah, Georgia.
