= Brampton Plantation =

Former plantation in Savannah, Georgia

- Interactive map of the Brampton Plantation area

General information
- Location: Savannah, Georgia, U.S.
- Coordinates: 32°06′48″N 81°08′16″W
- Construction started: 1748 (278 years ago)

Brampton Plantation was a plantation originally founded in colonial Savannah, Province of Georgia. It has been closely associated with Jonathan Bryan, a landowner, patriot and an associate of James Edward Oglethorpe, the founder of the Savannah colony. Bryan owned it from 1765 until his death in 1788. The plantation was located near the southern banks of the Savannah River, between National Gypsum Company and Union Camp Corporation, about 3.5 miles northwest of downtown Savannah. A cemetery, around 50 feet (15 m) by 40 feet (12 m) in size, also exists on the land. Bryan is entombed in a brick vault in the south-west corner of the cemetery.

For fifteen years after the 1733 foundation of the Savannah colony, the land was part of an Indian reservation; in 1757, the land was divided up and allotted to planters. David Graham was the first owner of the section that became Brampton.

John Garnier Williamson, a slaveholder, was the owner of Brampton when his probate inventory was recorded in 1814. His son, John Postell Williamson, inherited the plantation upon John Sr.'s death. In the early 20th century, Dr. James B. Read, whose mother was a Williamson, was the plantation owner.
