= Henry Ellis (governor) =

Canadian politician

6th colonial governor of Georgia
- In office May 17, 1758 – November 1760
- Lieutenant: Jonathan Belcher
- Preceded by: John Reynolds
- Succeeded by: James Wright

Governor of Nova Scotia
- In office 1760–1763
- Preceded by: Charles Lawrence
- Succeeded by: Montague Wilmot

Personal details
- Born: August 29, 1721 County Monaghan, Ireland
- Died: January 21, 1806 (aged 84) Naples, Italy
- Profession: Explorer, author, and governor

Henry Ellis (August 29, 1721 – January 21, 1806) was an Anglo-Irish explorer, author and slave trader who served as the governor of the colonies of Georgia. He was awarded governorship of Nova Scotia but never went to that province as his presence was required in London.

== Biography ==
=== Early years ===
Ellis was born August 29, 1721, in County Monaghan, Ireland, the son of Francis and Joan (née Maxwell) Ellis. He studied law at the Middle Temple in London. In May 1746, he went out as agent of a company for the discovery of the Northwest Passage. After extinguishing with difficulty a fire in his ship, he sailed to Greenland, where he exchanged commodities with the Inuit peoples on July 8. He then proceeded to Fort Nelson and wintered in Hayes River. He renewed his efforts in June 1747, without success, and returned to England where he arrived on October 14. He published an account of his explorations in 1748, entitled A voyage to Hudson's-Bay by the Dobbs Galley and California in the years 1746 and 1747 for discovering a North West Passage" and in 1750 published Considerations on the Great Advantages which would Arise from the Discovery of the North West Passage. After publishing these accounts, Ellis was inducted into the Royal Society. From 1750 to 1755, Ellis worked as a slave trader, purchasing slaves from Africa and shipping them to Jamaica.

=== Governor of Georgia ===
Lord Halifax, President of the Board of Trade, named Ellis lieutenant governor of Georgia on August 15, 1756. Ellis arrived at Savannah, Georgia, on February 16, 1757, and, on May 17, 1758, was made royal governor. His administration of the colony was highly esteemed. Recognizing the danger posed to the colony by hostile neighbors, he established a treaty with the Creeks. He published "Heat of the Weather in Georgia" in Philosophical Transactions of the Royal Society in 1758. The subtropical climate took its toll on his health and he had to be removed from governor then left Georgia on November 2, 1760, stopping in New York to request military assistance to the southern colonies.

=== Later years ===
After his return to England, his knowledge of American affairs were called into requisition for developing the plan for taxing the colonies. In return for this service he was rewarded with sinecure offices. From 1761 to 1763, he held the commission of governor of Nova Scotia, though he did not enter on the duties of his office. He afterward resided in Italy, principally occupied in scientific researches. Before he died he had a friendship with the Creek leader.

== Death ==
He died on January 21, 1806, aged 84, in Naples, Italy.

His nephew Francis Ellis (1772–1842), the father of Robert Leslie Ellis, was his principal heir.

== Legacy ==
Fort Ellis in Nova Scotia and Ellis Square in Savannah are named after him.

Political offices
Preceded by Charles Lawrence	Governor of Nova Scotia; 1761-1763	Succeeded by Jonathan Belcher (acting)
