= John Postell Williamson =

American real-estate owner and planter (1778–1843)

- Born: September 28, 1778; Pocotaligo, South Carolina, U.S.
- Died: January 3, 1843 (aged 64); Savannah, Georgia, U.S.
- Resting place: Brampton Plantation Cemetery, Savannah, Georgia, U.S.
- Spouse(s): Sarah McQueen (1804–1819; her death); Madeline Julia Dennis (1821–1843; his death)

John Postell Williamson (September 28, 1778 – January 3, 1843) was one of the wealthiest real-estate owners and planters in Savannah, Georgia, in the first half of the 19th century. He was elected mayor of Savannah in 1808 and served a one-year term.

== Life and career ==
Williamson was born on September 28, 1778, in Pocotaligo, South Carolina, to John Garnier Williamson and Jane Parmenter. He was one of their five children. His mother died when Williamson was around nineteen years old.

He married his second cousin Sarah McQueen on January 4, 1804. She died in 1819, at the age of 35, during the birth of their eighth child.

Also in 1804, Williamson was co-owner with John Morel of a factorage and commission business on Morel's wharf. Williamson switched partners to a Mr. Cowling upon Morel's retirement that October.

Williamson was elected a director of Planter's Bank in 1806.

In 1813, he resigned as ensign to lieutenant George Anderson in the United States Navy.

In 1820, Williamson built a two-storey brick Georgian-style home in the northwest corner of Savannah's now-demolished Liberty Square. He lived with his daughter, Sarah, and eleven slaves.

He married for a second time, to 18-year-old Madeline Julia Dennis, in 1821. Between his two marriages, he had fifteen children.

Williamson inherited the Brampton Plantation on which he was born, and he also owned plantations named Retreat, Clifton and Placentia. His son, John P. Jr. (possibly known as "J. J. Williamson"), purchased the plantation at public auction in 1848, but he was financially ruined when General Sherman's troops trampled and burned his fields and torched his home. The balcony was saved, and was later used at the Savannah home of Cornelia Groves. John P. Jr. never re-planted at Brampton, instead selling it to his cousin, Dr. James Bond Read, in 1867 for $11,000 (~$202,387 in 2024). The only part of the plantation that was reserved was the Williamson cemetery in its northeastern corner.

== Death ==
Williamson died on January 3, 1843, aged 64. His funeral was held in his home, after which he was interred in Savannah's Brampton Plantation Cemetery, alongside his first wife. Second wife, Madeline, survived him by 52 years. She is buried in Ashland Cemetery in Carlisle, Pennsylvania.

Williamson Street, which runs between East Bay Street and River Street at Savannah's waterfront, is named for him. The John Williamson Range, between West Bay Street and West River Street, is believed to be named for either John P. Sr. or John P. Jr.

== See also ==
- Jonathan Bryan
