= James Wright (governor) =

Governor of Georgia from 1716 to 1776

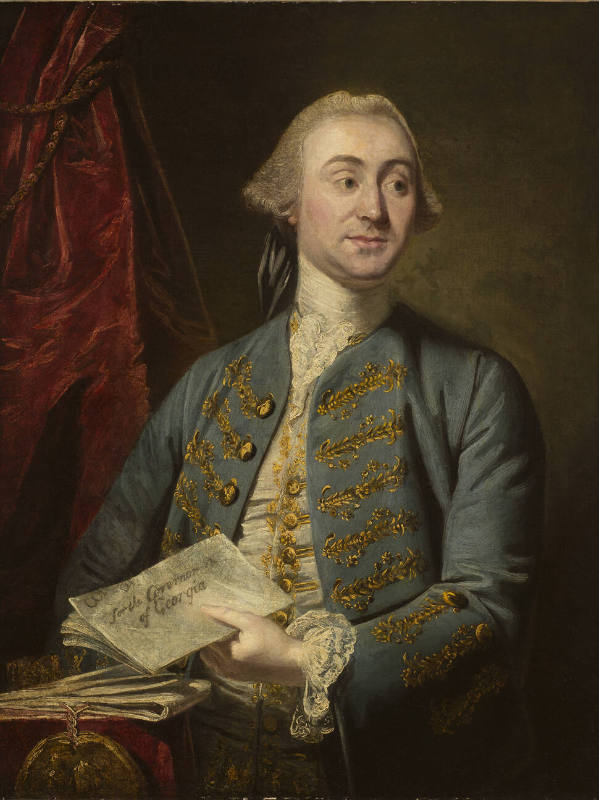
- Portrait attributed to Andrea Soldi, c. 1736–1771

Governor of Georgia
- In office 1760–1782
- Monarch: George III
- Preceded by: Henry Ellis
- Succeeded by: Archibald Campbell

Personal details
- Born: 8 May 1716 London, England
- Died: 20 November 1785 (aged 69) London, England
- Spouse: Sarah Maidman (died 1774)
- Children: 9
- Relatives: Robert Wright (father); Sir Robert Wright (grandfather)
- Profession: Lawyer, colonial administrator

James Wright (8 May 1716 – 20 November 1785) was a British lawyer and colonial administrator who served as the governor of Georgia from 1760 to 1782.

== Biography ==
James Wright was born in London to Robert Wright Jr, son of Sir Robert Wright, Lord Chief Justice of England.

In 1730 Robert Wright, James Wright's father, accompanied Robert Johnson to the Province of South Carolina and served as its Chief Justice until 1739. James followed soon after and began the practice of law in Charleston. On 14 August 1741 he entered Gray's Inn in London. In 1747 James was named colonial attorney-general. He also began amassing plantation lands.

Wright returned to London as an agent for the South Carolina colony in 1757. On one of his England visits, or on all of them, he stayed with his cousin William Rugge, the ancestor of the Rugge-Price baronets, on Conduit Street. Then, in May 1760, he was named as Lieutenant Governor to Henry Ellis in Georgia. He returned to America and took up residence in Savannah, Province of Georgia. When Ellis resigned he was appointed Governor in November 1760. He was the third, and arguably most popular, Royal Governor of the colony. He sold many of his holdings in South Carolina, acquired land in Georgia, and moved his financial operations as well. With peace temporarily established with the French and Spanish, he successfully negotiated with the Indians and the Crown to open new lands to development. In his early administration, the new lands and economic improvement fostered the development of the Georgia colony.

His first troubles came with the Stamp Act of 1765. But, in spite of efforts by the Sons of Liberty to block its implementation, Georgia was the only colony to import and actually use the revenue stamps. In 1768, Wright established the 12,000-acre settlement known as Wrightsboro, Georgia. Wrightsboro was set aside for displaced Quakers from North Carolina and became home to William Few when his family fled North Carolina after their farm had been burned and James Few, William's brother had been hanged without a trial. As the American Revolution gathered momentum, Georgia remained the most loyal colony—due in part to its recent settlement, with many residents having direct ties through kinship in Great Britain, and, in part as well, to Wright's able administration. Georgia did not send delegates to the First Continental Congress in 1774. That same year saw the death of his wife, Sarah.

By 1775, the revolutionary spirit had reached Georgia through the Committees of correspondence and he dismissed the assembly. But a revolutionary congress met that summer in Savannah and elected delegates to the Second Continental Congress. Then, in early 1776, following the arrival of a small British fleet, rebel forces entered his home and briefly took him prisoner. Wright escaped on 11 February 1776, via Bonaventure Plantation and with the assistance of two compatriots, colonel John Mullryne and Josiah Tattnall (father of future Governor of Georgia, Josiah Tattnall Jr.), to the safety of HMS Scarborough, and sent a letter to his council. The congress and the council adjourned without answering him.

For a time, Wright continued negotiations. He was even able to trade with the rebels to keep his offshore troops and ships supplied. But the differences continued to escalate. When his attempt to retake Savannah with naval forces failed, he returned to England.

By 1778, Governor Wright convinced the government to lend him enough troops to once again attempt to take Savannah. After some short but sharp fights, he regained control of Savannah on 29 December 1778. While never fully in control of the state, he did restore large areas within Georgia to colonial rule, making this the only colony that was regained by the British once they had been expelled. He led a successful defense against several American and French attempts to capture the city. When the war in the North American theatre was lost, he withdrew on 11 July 1782 and retired to England.

Wright's extensive properties were seized by the revolutionary governments in South Carolina and Georgia. He died in London, and is interred at Westminster Abbey.

== Wright's offspring ==
James F. Cook in his book The Governors of Georgia 1754-2004 states that Sir James Wright (1716–1785) and Sarah Maidman (died 1763) had nine children. They were:

- Sir James Wright (1747–1816), the 2nd Baronet. He married Sarah Williamson Smith, daughter of Captain John Smith and Elizabeth Williamson (other sources such as Burke's Peerage of 1833 incorrectly call her Mary Smith, daughter of John Smith, a former governor of South Carolina) and died without issue.
- Sarah (born 1744), who went with her father Sir James Wright and her brothers James, Alexander, and Charles to Jamaica with other family members, where they were granted land, and later to England to join her father, where she married William Bartram of Norfolk, a Jacobite.
- Alexander (born 1751), who was a Loyalist and lost his American estates. He moved to Jamaica and married Elizabeth Izard, daughter of John Izard and niece of Congressman Ralph Izard. He was the father of Sir James Alexander Wright, the 3rd Baronet and of John Izard Wright, the father of Sir John Wright, the 4th Baronet.
- Charles
- Ann (born 1749), who married British Admiral James Wallace
- Elizabeth
- Charlotte
- Mary (1742–1763)
- Isabella, who married General Thomas Barrow in 1757

== Legacy ==
Wright Square in Savannah, Georgia, is named in his honour. Wrightsboro, Georgia is also named after him.
