= John Williamson Range =

Historic building in Georgia

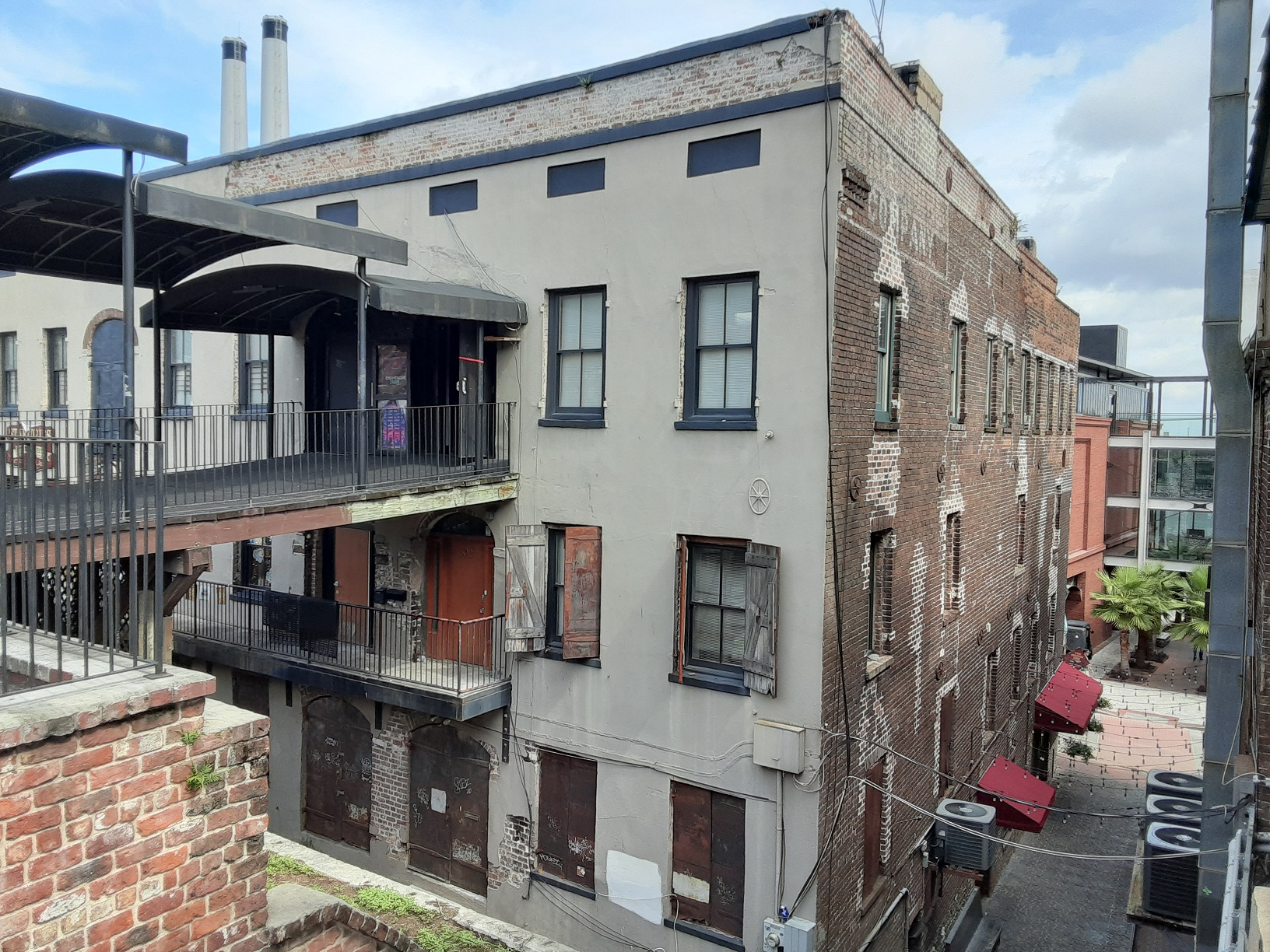
- The building in 2021, viewed from West Bay Street
- Interactive map of the John Williamson Range area

General information
- Location: 302–310 West Bay Street, Savannah, Georgia, United States
- Coordinates: 32.0827°N 81.0944°W
- Completed: 1819 (207 years ago)

Technical details
- Floor count: 3–4

John Williamson Range is a historic building in Savannah, Georgia, United States. Located in Savannah's Historic District, the addresses of some of the properties are West Bay Street, above Factors Walk, while others solely utilize the former King Cotton warehouses on River Street. As of February 2022, these are Two Cracked Eggs, Rusty Rudders Tap House, Nine Line, Black Rifle Coffee Company and 309 West.

The building was completed in 1819, and is believed to be named for either John Postell Williamson, the city's former mayor, or his son John P. Jr., who is believed to also have been known as "J. J. Williamson". Improvements were made to the building in 1850, before it was damaged by fire in 1879, 1889 and 1898.

In 1921, the Shapiro Shoe Company was based at number 302. At the same time, another part of the building was occupied by J. J. Williamson & Company cotton merchants, established in 1904. Their home office was in Atlanta, but they had branches in Savannah, Augusta, Memphis, Dallas, Birmingham and Tupelo, and were members of both the New York Cotton Exchange and the New Orleans Cotton Exchange.

In 1922, the cotton firm of Inman & Howard in Atlanta dissolved its partnership. Frank Inman combined his interests with those of J. J. Williamson & Company, under the name of Williamson, Inman & Stribling.

== River Street façade ==
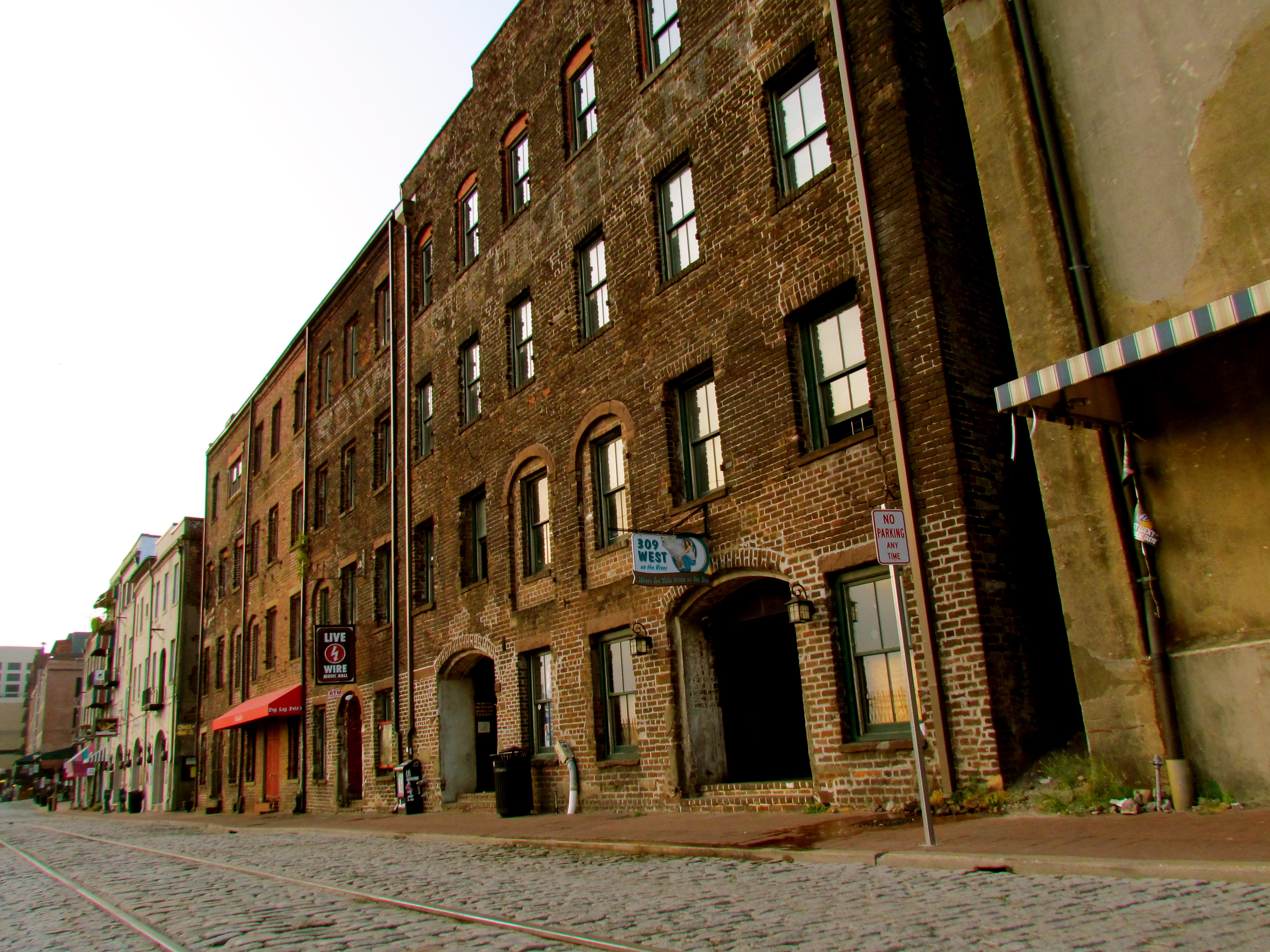
Looking east, 2011

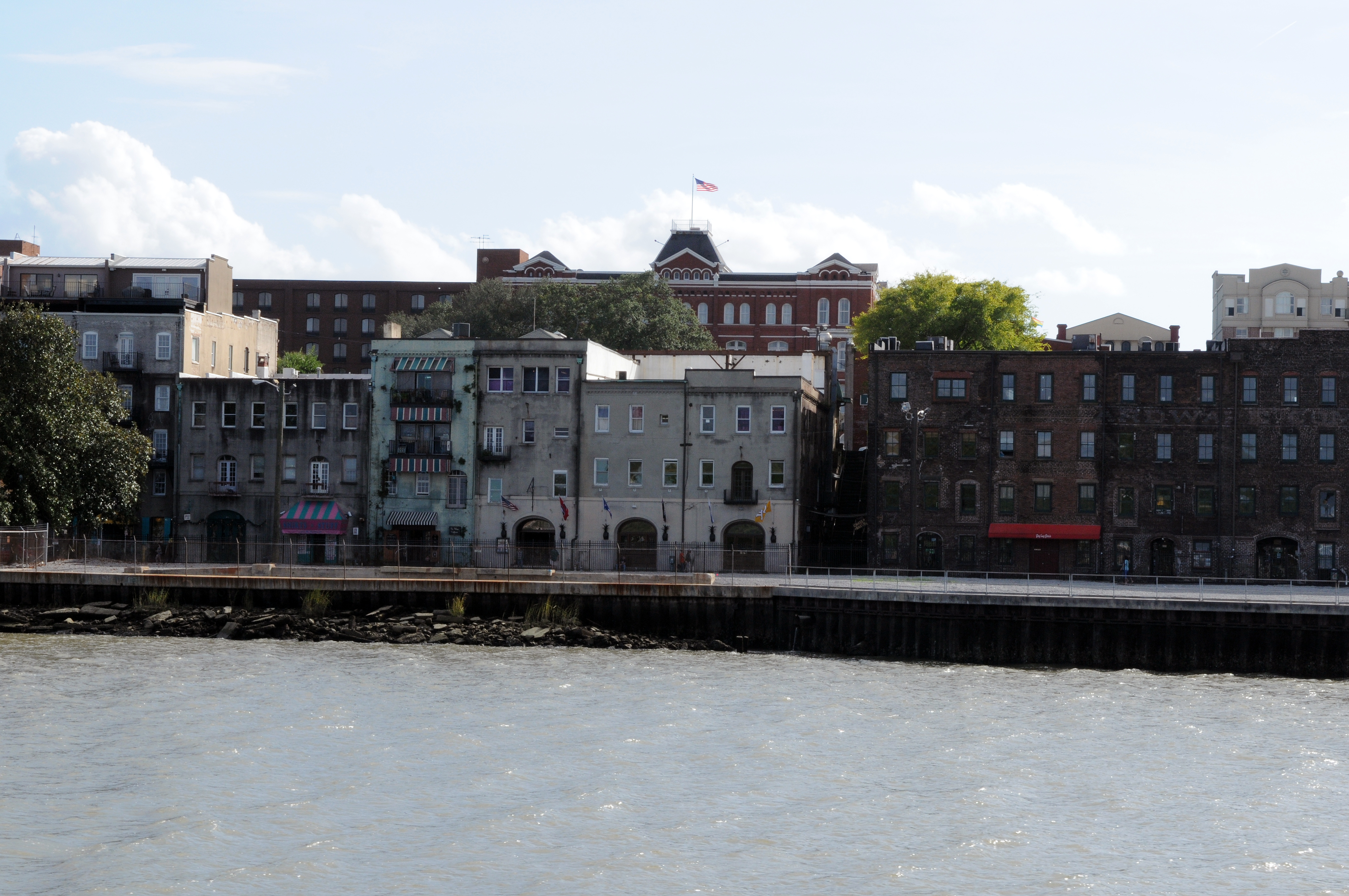
This 2012 view is now obscured by the construction of the JW Marriott Savannah Plant Riverside District on the northern side of River Street. 220–224 West Bay Street is on the left

== See also ==
- Buildings in Savannah Historic District
