= HMS Ocean (1761) =

1761 ship of the line of the Royal Navy

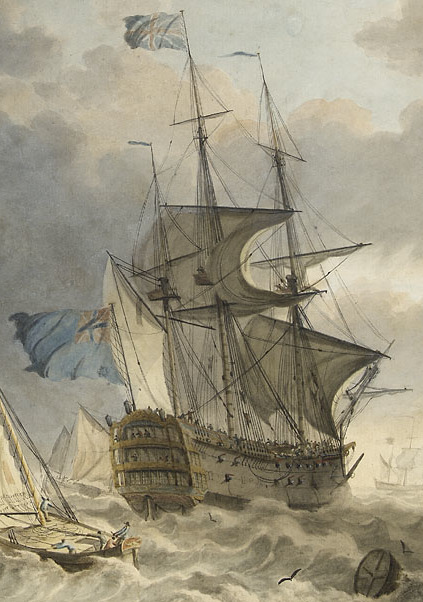
- Ocean circa 1771

History

Great Britain
- Name: Ocean
- Ordered: 22 April 1758
- Builder: Chatham Dockyard
- Laid down: 4 August 1758
- Launched: 21 April 1761
- Commissioned: April 1761
- Fate: Broken up, October 1791

General characteristics
- Class & type: Sandwich-class ship of the line
- Tons burthen: 18338/94 (bm)
- Length: 176 ft (54 m) (gundeck)
- Beam: 49 ft (15 m)
- Depth of hold: 24 ft (7.3 m)
- Propulsion: Sails
- Sail plan: Full-rigged ship
- Complement: 750
- Armament: 90 guns: Gundeck: 28 × 32 pdrs; Middle gundeck: 30 × 18 pdrs; Upper gundeck: 30 × 12 pdrs; Forecastle: 2 × 9 pdrs

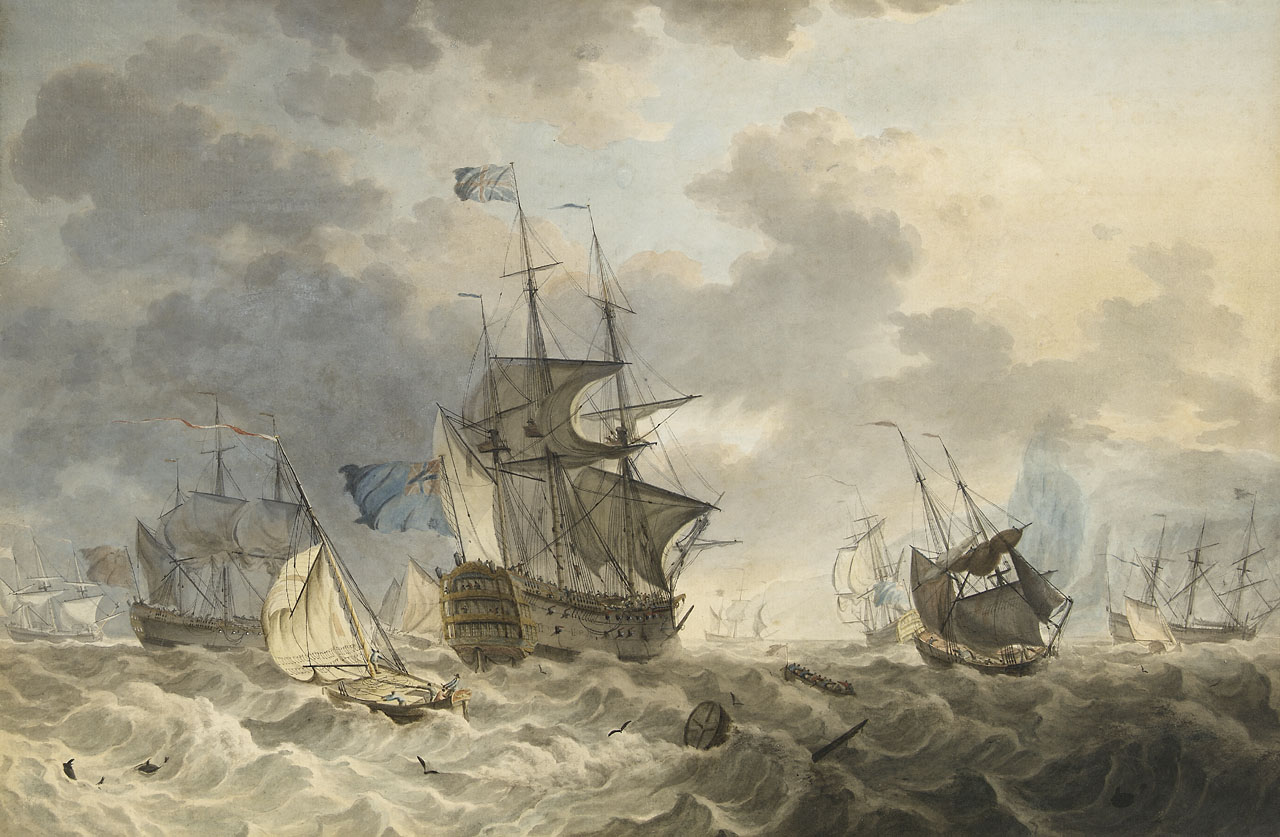
HMS Ocean, 2nd Rate. Union at the Main off Gibraltar with tenders, by Hendrik Kobell

HMS Ocean was a 90-gun second rate ship of the line of the Royal Navy, launched on 21 April 1761 at Chatham.

Ocean was commissioned for service in April 1761 under Captain William Langdon. She was initially assigned to the British fleet under the overall command of Admiral Edward Hawke. In March 1763 Ocean was found to be surplus to Hawke's requirements and she was returned to Plymouth Dockyard to be paid off and placed in ordinary. She remained out of service for the following seven years, undergoing minor repairs in 1769 but not being returned to sea. She was finally recommissioned in October 1770 under Captain James Cranston, and set sail to bolster the Royal Navy presence during the Falklands Crisis with Spain and France.

The crisis concluding without battle, Ocean was returned to Plymouth where she was designated as a guard ship for the port, under the command of Captain Joseph Knight. She was the flagship for Port Admiral Richard Spry from 1772, taking part in home waters patrols and in the Spithead review of June 1773. Captain Knight vacated the vessel in 1774, with command passing briefly to Captain John Reynolds and then to Captain John Laforey. In March 1776 Laforey was replaced by Captain Edward Le Cras, but resumed his post in December of the same year.

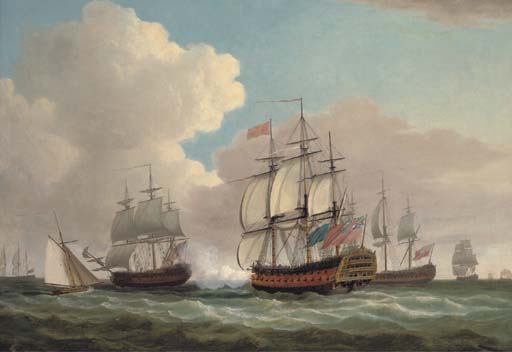
Ocean joining Admiral Keppel's fleet off Ushant, July 1778. Dominic Serres

She was sold out of the service in 1793.
