= Antoine O'Connor =

French engineer

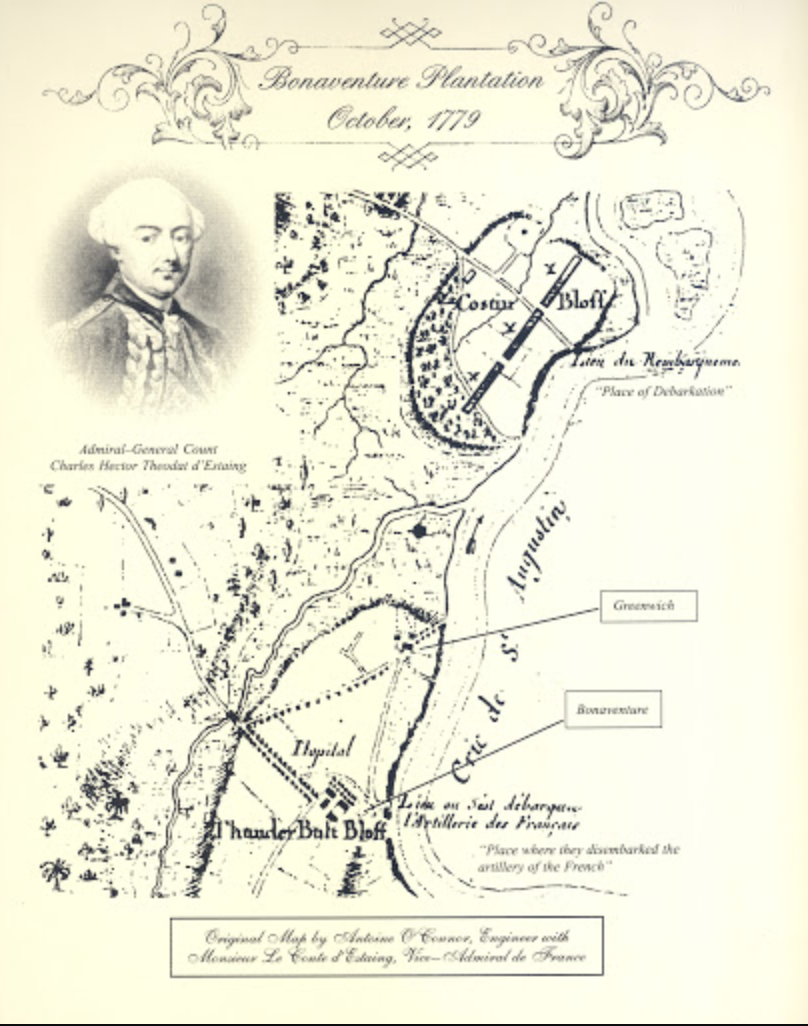
An October 1779 map by O'Connor of the coastline to the east of the Savannah colony, including Bonaventure Plantation

Antoine–François Térence O'Connor was a prominent 18th-century surveyor and cartographer. He was chief engineer of French admiral Charles Henri Hector d'Estaing.

He wrote an account of the 1779 siege of Savannah. Originally titled Journal of the Siege of Savannah, with Some Observations by M. le Comte d'Estaing, it was published in 1974 as part of Muskets, Cannon Balls and Bombs; Nine Narratives of the Siege of Savannah in 1779. d'Estaing provided the document's preface and marginal comments. The document became notable for illustrating the process of building Franco-American cooperations.

O'Connor, who was described as a "highly capable Irish Catholic", was educated at the age of 29 in France's School of Engineers.
