= Josiah Tattnall III =

United States Navy officer (1795–1871)

Josiah Tattnall
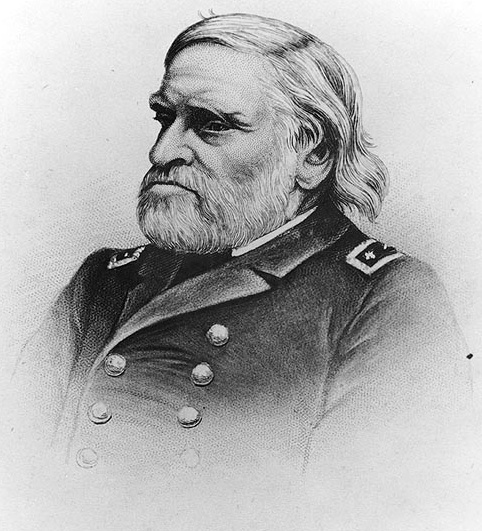
- Born: Josiah Tattnall III; November 9, 1795; Savannah, Georgia, U.S.
- Died: June 14, 1871 (aged 75); Savannah, Georgia, U.S.
- Spouse: Harriette Fenwick Tattnall
- Relatives: Josiah Tattnall Jr. (father); Josiah Tattnall Sr. (grandfather)
- Military career
- Allegiance: United States; Confederate States
- Branch: United States Navy (USN); Confederate States Navy (CSN)
- Service years: 1812–1861 (USN); 1861–1865 (CSN)
- Rank: Captain (USN); Commodore (CSN)
- Commands: East India Squadron; James River Squadron
- Conflicts: War of 1812; Battle of Craney Island; Battle of Bladensburg; Second Barbary War; Battle off Cape Gata; Battle off Cape Palos; Mexican–American War; Siege of Veracruz; San Juan de Ulúa; Tuxpan Expedition; Second Opium War; Battle of Taku Forts; American Civil War; Battle of Port Royal

Commodore Josiah Tattnall III (November 9, 1795 – June 14, 1871) was a United States Navy officer during the War of 1812, the Second Barbary War, the Mexican–American War and the Second Opium War. He later served in the Confederate States Navy during the American Civil War.

== Schooling and War of 1812 ==
Josiah was the son of Josiah Tattnall, who was Governor and U.S. Senator from Georgia. He was born on his father's Bonaventure Plantation, near Savannah, Georgia. After studying in England, he was appointed a midshipman on January 1, 1812, and attended the naval academy at Washington, D.C., until 1 August when he was assigned to the frigate Constellation.

When his ship tried to slip out to sea, the Royal Navy squadron operating in the Chesapeake Bay forced her to flee to Norfolk, Virginia. Constellation remained bottled up in Hampton Roads for the duration of the war, and Tattnall was among the 100 or so sailors and marines assigned to the shore battery on Craney Island. On June 22, 1813, the British attempted to carry the island by storm in preparation for an attack on nearby Norfolk. Tattnall's battery and a force of American boats resisted the attack, which deterred the British from further attempts to take the city.

In April 1814, Tattnall was detached from Constellation and, by August 24, was in command of a force of employees from the Washington Navy Yard. He led them into the Battle of Bladensburg in an unsuccessful effort to stop the British advance on the American capital. On October 14, he was ordered to Savannah for duty on USS Epervier. In May 1815, that sloop sailed for the Mediterranean with Commodore Stephen Decatur's squadron to engage the Barbary Pirates in Algiers in the Second Barbary War. On June 17, she participated in the capture of the frigate Mashouda and, two days later, of the brig Estedio. In July, when Epervier was ordered back to the United States with dispatches, Tattnall remained in the Mediterranean in Constellation. In January 1817, he transferred to Ontario and returned in her to the United States.

== Interwar years, 1818–1845 ==
Promoted to lieutenant on April 1, 1818, Tattnall was assigned to the frigate Macedonian on June 30, and he sailed in her for the Pacific in November. He was detached from Macedonian on August 30, 1820, and returned to the United States. Ordered to Norfolk on December 26, 1822, he joined Commodore David Porter's squadron in schooner Jackall. Lieutenant Tattnall served in the West Indies on an expedition to suppress piracy until he was detached on May 4, 1823. On June 23, 1824, Tattnall was ordered to Constitution for Mediterranean service. In March 1826, he transferred to Brandywine and returned home in her in May. On the 15th of that month, he was granted six months leave, which was later extended into 1828.

Tattnall served in Erie from October 1828 to August 1829 and then went on to survey the Tortugas until March 1830. Lt. Tattnall took command of schooner Grampus on April 15, 1831, and cruised the West Indies and the Gulf of Mexico. In August 1832, he captured the Mexican schooner, Montezuma, which had boarded and robbed an American ship on the high seas. He was detached from Grampus in September 1832 and went on leave awaiting orders for almost four years before being ordered in, July 1836, to recruit men for Captain Thomas ap Catesby Jones' survey and exploration expedition.

Tattnall was promoted to commander on February 25, 1836, and, in April, reported for a three-year tour of duty at the Boston Navy Yard.

== Mexican–American War ==
Following service with the Mediterranean and African squadrons, Commander Tattnall joined the Mosquito Division in the Gulf of Mexico in 1846, commanding the steam gunboat, Spitfire. During the Mexican–American War, he took part in the attacks on Vera Cruz, San Juan d'Ulloa, and Tuxpan, and he suffered an arm wound. For his gallantry before Vera Cruz, the state of Georgia presented him with a sword.

== Interwar years, 1848–1860 ==
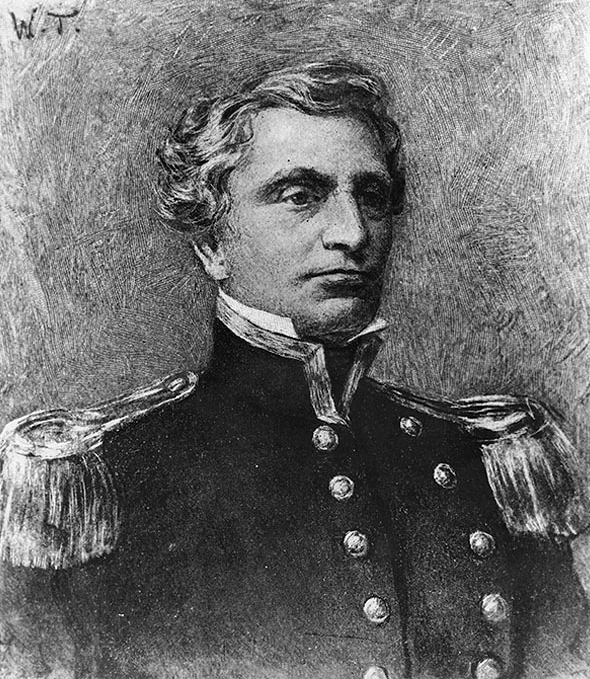
Portrait showing him in pre-Civil War uniform

In 1848 and 1849, he returned to shore duty at the Boston Navy Yard. On February 5, 1850, he was commissioned captain and, the following month, was given command of Saranac. Next, he commanded the Pensacola Navy Yard from July 1851 to June 1854. From August 1854 to November 1855, Captain Tattnall was flag captain in Independence to Commodore William Mervine with the Pacific Squadron. At Hong Kong on January 29, 1858, he relieved Commodore James Armstrong taking command of the East India Squadron, breaking his flag in San Jacinto. During his two years in the Far East, Commodore Tattnall violated American neutrality while commanding the chartered steamer Toey-Wan, when he came to the assistance of a British and French squadron under fire from the Taku Forts at the mouth of the Pei Ho or Hai River. His explanation of his action, "blood is thicker than water", subsequently became a famous slogan.

On his return voyage early in 1860, Tattnall commanded the Powhatan, carrying the first diplomatic embassy from Tokugawa Japan to the United States. While stopped at Honolulu, Hawaii, along the way, the British residents of that city wrote a letter thanking Tattnall for his "gallant and humane conduct" during the "unfortunate affair at the Pei-ho River". The embassy was safely conveyed to San Francisco and then Panama, where they crossed the isthmus and continued on to Washington, D.C.

== American Civil War ==
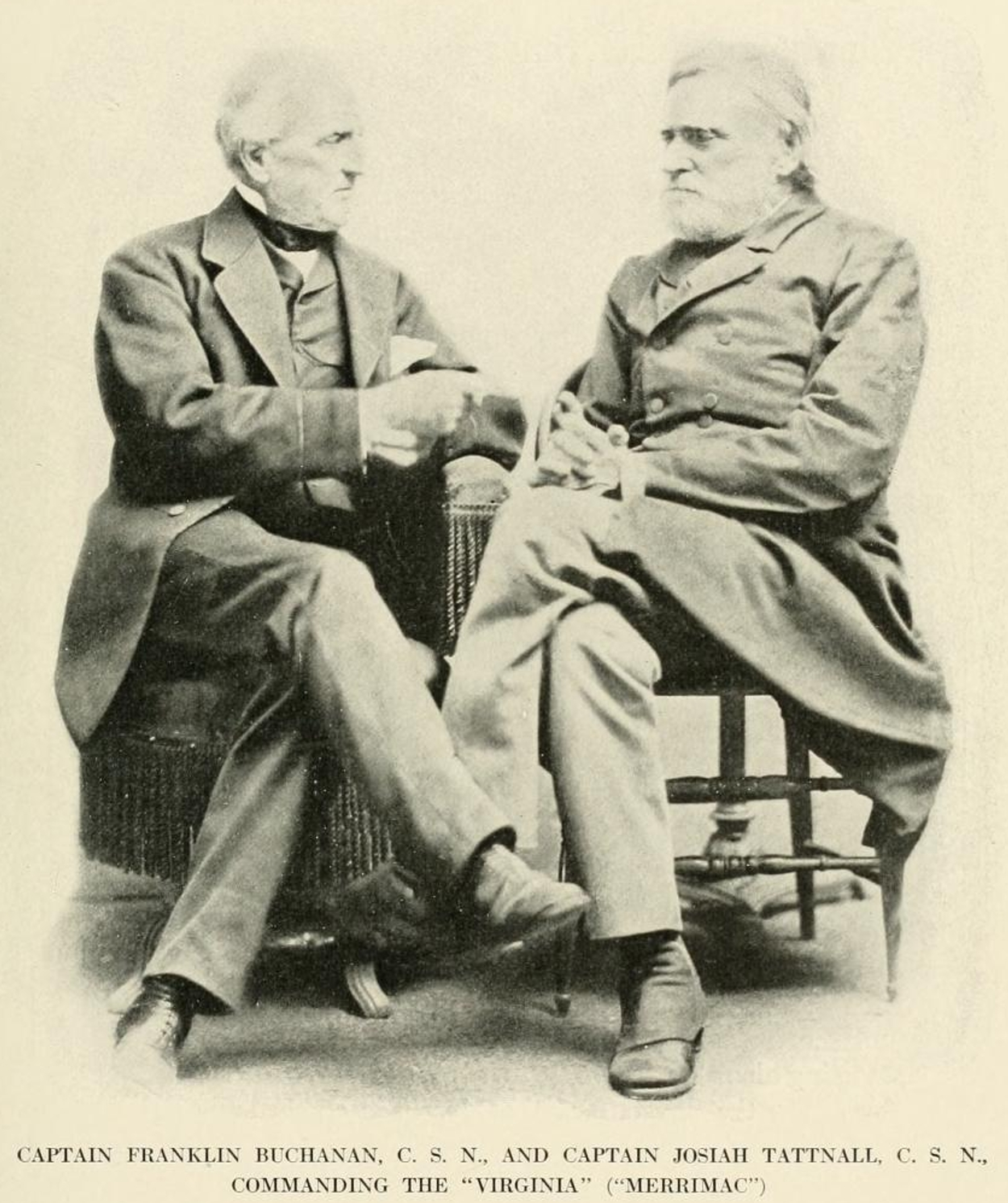
Captain Franklin Buchanan & Captain Josiah Tattnall

At the outbreak of the Civil War, Capt. Tattnall held command of the Sackett's Harbor Station. Tattnall resigned his commission on February 21, 1861. A week later, Governor Joseph E. Brown commissioned Tattnall as the senior flag officer of the Navy of Georgia. On March 26, 1861, he received his commission as a captain in the Confederate Navy. Tattnall commanded Southern naval units during the defense of Port Royal until the harbor was captured by Union forces on 7 November 1861. From there, he moved to overall command of the defense of Virginia's waters early in March 1862. Tattnall, by then a flag officer in the Confederate Navy as well as the Navy of Georgia, directed CSS Jamestown and other warships in captures of Federal merchantmen off Sewell's Point in April 1862.

On May 11, 1862, in the face of advancing Federal forces, Flag Officer Tattnall ordered the destruction of his flagship, CSS Virginia (ex-Merrimack). He was later acquitted by a court martial of all charges stemming from that action. He resumed command of the naval forces of Georgia on May 29, 1862, and retained it until 31 March 1863, when he turned over command of forces afloat to Comdr. Richard L. Page and concentrated upon the shore defenses of Savannah. When Savannah fell to General William Tecumseh Sherman's troops, Tattnall became a prisoner of war.

He was paroled on May 9, 1865, and, soon thereafter, took up residence once more in Savannah.

== Death ==
Tattnall died on June 14, 1871, in Savannah. He was living at the time on South Broad Street. He was buried in Bonaventure Cemetery, in the Tattnall family plot (section E, lot 1), beside his wife.

=== Legacy ===
Two ships have been named USS Tattnall in his honor.

== See also ==
- Siege of Fort Pulaski

Military offices
Preceded by James Armstrong	Commander, East India Squadron; 29 January 1858–20 November 1859	Succeeded by Cornelius Stribling
Preceded by Franklin Buchanan	Commander, James River Squadron; 29 March 1862–15 May 1862	Succeeded by John Randolph Tucker
