= John Reynolds (Royal Navy officer) =

Royal Navy officer (1714–1788)

Admiral John Reynolds
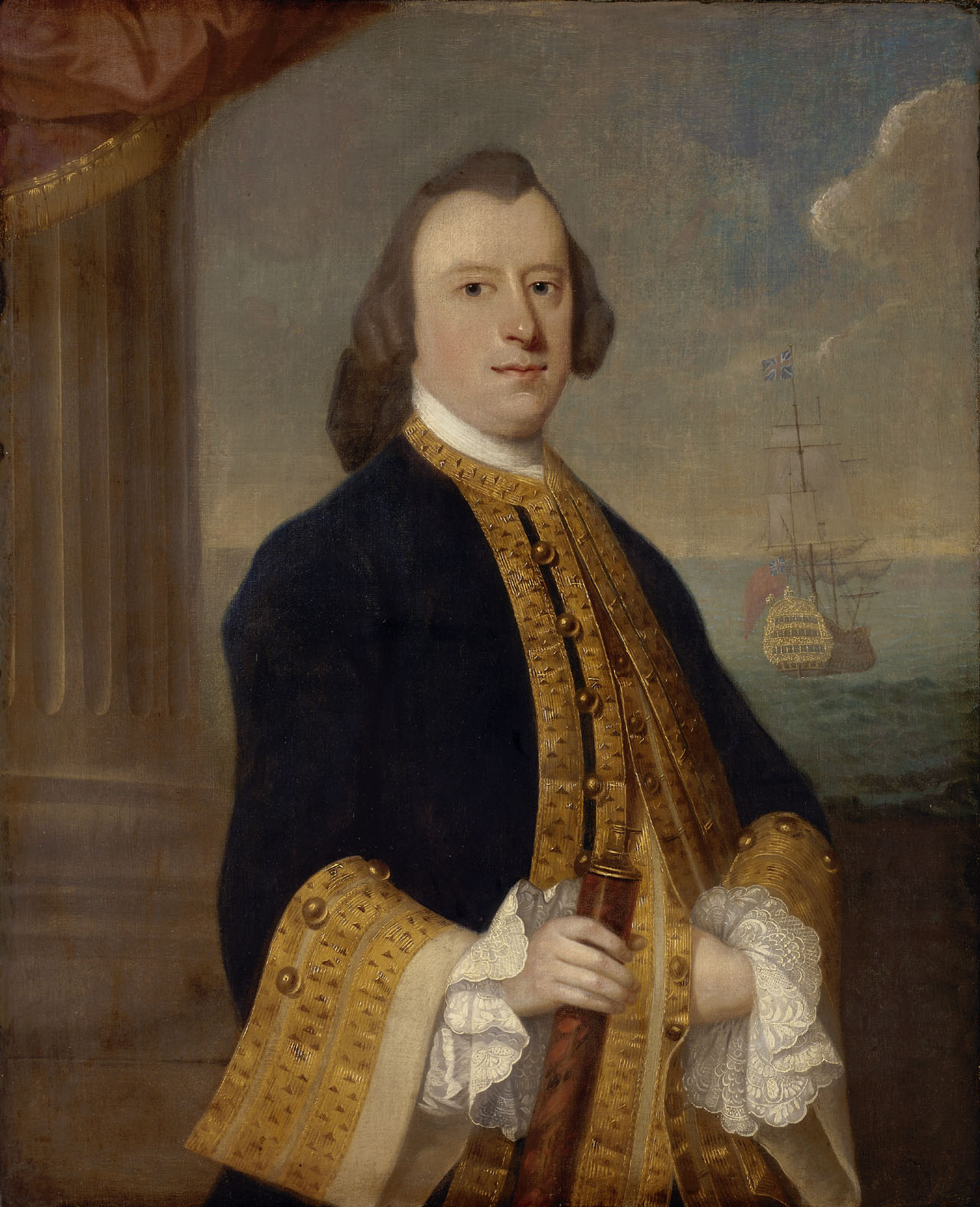
- Portrait by Jeremiah Theus, 1754–1758

Governor of Georgia
- In office 1754–1757
- Monarch: George II
- Preceded by: Patrick Graham
- Succeeded by: Henry Ellis

Personal details
- Born: c. 1714 England
- Died: 3 February 1788 London, England
- Spouse: Maria Catharina Langin

Military service
- Allegiance: Great Britain
- Branch/service: Royal Navy
- Years of service: 1728–1788
- Rank: Admiral
- Unit: HMS Aldborough; HMS Argyll; HMS Jersey; HMS Victory; HMS Ambuscade; HMS Centurion
- Commands: HMS Vulcan; HMS Scipio; HMS Arundel; HMS Firm; HMS Temple; HMS Milford; HMS Fame; HMS Burford; HMS Defence; HMS Ocean
- Battles/wars: War of the Austrian Succession; Seven Years' War

Admiral John Reynolds (c. 1714 – 3 February 1788) was a Royal Navy officer and colonial administrator who served as the governor of Georgia from 1754 to 1757. At the end of a long life of service, he became admiral shortly before his death.

== Early life ==
Born c. 1714, he entered the Navy in 1728 as a "volunteer per order" with Captain John Gascoigne on board the frigate HMS Aldborough, in which he served for six years. He passed his examination on 31 July 1734, being then, according to his certificate, 21 years old. He was promoted to the rank of lieutenant on 14 October 1736.

== War of the Austrian Succession ==
In 1739–40 Reynolds was serving in HMS Argyll on the home station. The War of the Austrian Succession broke out; and in June 1741 he was appointed to the fireship HMS Vulcan, then in the West Indies. She was paid off in November 1742, and Reynolds went on half-pay. In 1743 he was first lieutenant of HMS Jersey, and from her, in February 1743–44, was moved to HMS Victory, which he left before she sailed for the Tagus River in July 1744 on what was to be her last voyage (see Sir John Balchen).

On 23 April 1745 Reynolds was promoted to be commander of the fireship HMS Scipio on the home station. In the following December he was placed on half-pay. In August 1746 he was temporarily appointed to HMS Ambuscade at Plymouth; and similarly, in September, to HMS Centurion at Portsmouth, from which on 30 October he was posted to HMS Arundel. He was, however, not relieved from Centurion till 22 November. During 1747 Arundel was employed in the English Channel, cruising with some success against enemy merchantmen, and afterwards in convoy service in the North Sea.

== Mission against pirates ==
In May 1748 Reynolds, still in Arundel, was sent out to Charles Town, from which he went to Jamaica. In December he received orders to return to Charles Town, and patrol South Carolina, Georgia, and the Bahamas, an area then a resort of pirates. He continued on this station for over two years, returning to England in 1751.

== Governor of Georgia ==
Reynolds returned to England in 1751 in search of a new command. As did most appointed officials of the British Empire in the eighteenth century, Reynolds obtained his various commands through patronage. His sponsor, Philip Yorke, 1st Earl of Hardwicke, encouraged Lord George Halifax, President of the Board of Trade, to appoint Reynolds as the new governor of royal Georgia in 1754.

Reynolds arrived at Savannah on 29 October 1754. Local residents met him with celebrations of bells and bonfires to express their hopes that he heralded a new era for the colony, in contrast to the Trustees' administration, which had ended in June 1752. Georgians desired a more dependable government, territorial expansion, border protection, and a profitable economy. Reynolds, however, saw primarily a poor colony in which the high cost of living would drain, rather than supplement, his salary of £600 a year. He lived on the eastern side of Oglethorpe Square, the location of the home now filled by a car park.

Following instructions from the Board of Trade, Reynolds established a structure of royal government, including courts, a council, and the Commons House of Assembly. Reynolds then directed the council to move into a new building when the original structure collapsed during his first meeting with that body. He acted decisively when the assembly faced a challenge from Augusta legislator Edmund Gray (or Grey), an immigrant from Virginia. Gray excited fears among the people about the extent of royal authority and tried to maneuver elections and assembly support to control a significant voting bloc within the Georgia legislature. Reynolds refused to be intimidated, and his forceful leadership encouraged the assembly to expel the Gray faction in January 1755.

Reynolds's military efforts, however, proved less than successful. His arrival in Georgia coincided with the first rumblings of the Seven Years' War (1756–1763). His overall defense plans relied so heavily upon the British government to supply increasing numbers of troops, artillery, and forts that his London superiors refused to comply. Moreover, in November 1755 Reynolds abruptly returned to Savannah after waiting ten days for Muscogee chiefs to arrive at Augusta. He had called the meeting to renew friendly relations but left the negotiations and a contingency of disappointed Muscogee in the hands of an associate, William Little.

Georgians might have forgiven Reynolds this indiscretion if the governor had demonstrated tact and diplomacy in the rest of his administrative efforts. But Reynolds acted as if he held a naval command instead of a civil office. He expected instant responses to his directives and resisted any challenge to his authority. In addition, Reynolds publicly proclaimed his intentions to leave Georgia whenever a more profitable appointment came his way.

Reynolds's style of command quickly angered the council. He refused to share his official instructions, which outlined the new royal government in Georgia, and communicated titbits of that document only when he deemed necessary. Reynolds failed to realise that council members sought to understand their role in the new royal government and to ensure that the governor did not overstep his constitutional powers. In the absence of such information, council members took their authority to advise and give consent to the governor literally. They questioned and debated his every move.

The council targeted the bulk of its displeasure against Little, a former naval surgeon and shipmate of Reynolds who served as the governor's secretary. The governor bestowed six additional offices upon Little, including clerk of the Commons House of Assembly and commissioner of Indian affairs. By September 1755 the council complained that Little interfered in governmental affairs, showed disrespect to the council, and exhibited dishonesty in office. Reynolds insisted that he possessed the power to interpret the rights and duties of provincial officials. To demonstrate his authority, he removed councilman Clement Martin from office and eliminated only two of Little's titles. Throughout his term in office Reynolds continued to quarrel with notable councilors, including James Habersham and Noble W. Jones.

While Reynolds did guide the house to enact several bills that helped to administer the colony, by early 1756 members of the House of Assembly joined the growing dissatisfaction with the governor. Reynolds dissolved the legislature in February 1756, when it appeared that members might challenge his authority. To counter opposition, Reynolds relied heavily upon Little to use his office as clerk of the house, and then as its elected Speaker, to create a pro-Reynolds faction during the fall of 1756. Little's efforts ironically included men who had supported Edmund Gray the year before. As opposition grew against his administration, Reynolds took steps to control Georgia's General Court as well.

By that time a letter from Jonathan Bryan, one of the province's largest landholders, and a scathing memorial concerning Reynolds and Little—hand-carried by the provost marshal, Alexander Kellet—had made their way to the Board of Trade. That body voted to recall Reynolds and ordered the governor back to England to give testimony about his actions. The board sent a lieutenant governor, Henry Ellis, as a replacement. Reynolds relinquished the government to Ellis on 16 February 1757, and delayed his return to England for several weeks to collect information for his defense. Once Reynolds left Georgia, he endured a brief capture by the French. When the board finally heard Reynolds's case in the spring of 1758, he received no punishment, except orders to resign as governor.

Reynolds's administration created great distress for Georgians, initiated a loss of revenue, and gave the colony a negative image for potential immigrants. Yet provincial leaders gained important lessons about methods of cooperation with the royal executive and their own ability to challenge an administration with which they disagreed. They used such knowledge to create a stronger reciprocal relationship with subsequent royal officials, which generally lasted until the American War of Independence.

== Seven Years' War ==
In May 1759 he was directed to HMS Firm, of 60 guns, with which, in June, he joined the fleet off Brest under the command of Sir Edward Hawke. Hawke detached him as commodore of the squadron off Quiberon Bay. On this post he was afterwards relieved by Robert Duff, but was still detached from the fleet on 17 November, when, off the Isle Groix, he had news of the French fleet being at sea. He sent this off at once to the British Admiralty, while he himself stood to the westward in the hope of meeting Hawke. This he did not succeed in doing, and he did not join the admiral till some days after the Battle of Quiberon Bay on 20 November.

The following February he was moved into HMS Temple, from which in March he was superseded. He afterwards commanded the frigate HMS Milford, till the peace of 1763.

== Later life ==
During the following years he lived at Newington Butts, and from 1766 to 1768 commanded HMS Fame, guardship at Plymouth. He then returned to Newington Butts, and in October 1768 sent to the Admiralty a proposal of a method of giving ships way through the water in a calm.

In 1769 Reynolds commanded HMS Burford, guardship at Plymouth; and from 1770 to 1773 HMS Defence, in which in 1770 he took out troops to Gibraltar. In 1773 he commanded HMS Dublin for some months, and in November was appointed to HMS Ocean at Plymouth, from which he was relieved in the end of 1774.

Reynolds was promoted to rear admiral on 31 March 1775, and to vice admiral on 29 January 1778. He then suffered from a paralytic stroke. He attained the rank of admiral on 24 September 1787, and died in London on 3 February 1788.

=== Legacy ===
Reynolds Square in Savannah, Georgia, is named for him.

== Family ==
Reynolds was married twice, but his first wife was his younger sister. In 1761 he married Maria Catharina Langin from a Swabian Protestant family who had emigrated to Georgia. Their daughter Maria Catharina Reynolds later married James Sowerby. Reynolds had a son George out of wedlock; he was also a naval officer, surviving the wreck of HMS Pandora, and father of the engraver Alfred Reynolds.
