= Siege of Savannah (1779) =

1779 siege of the American Revolutionary War

- Part of the American Revolutionary War
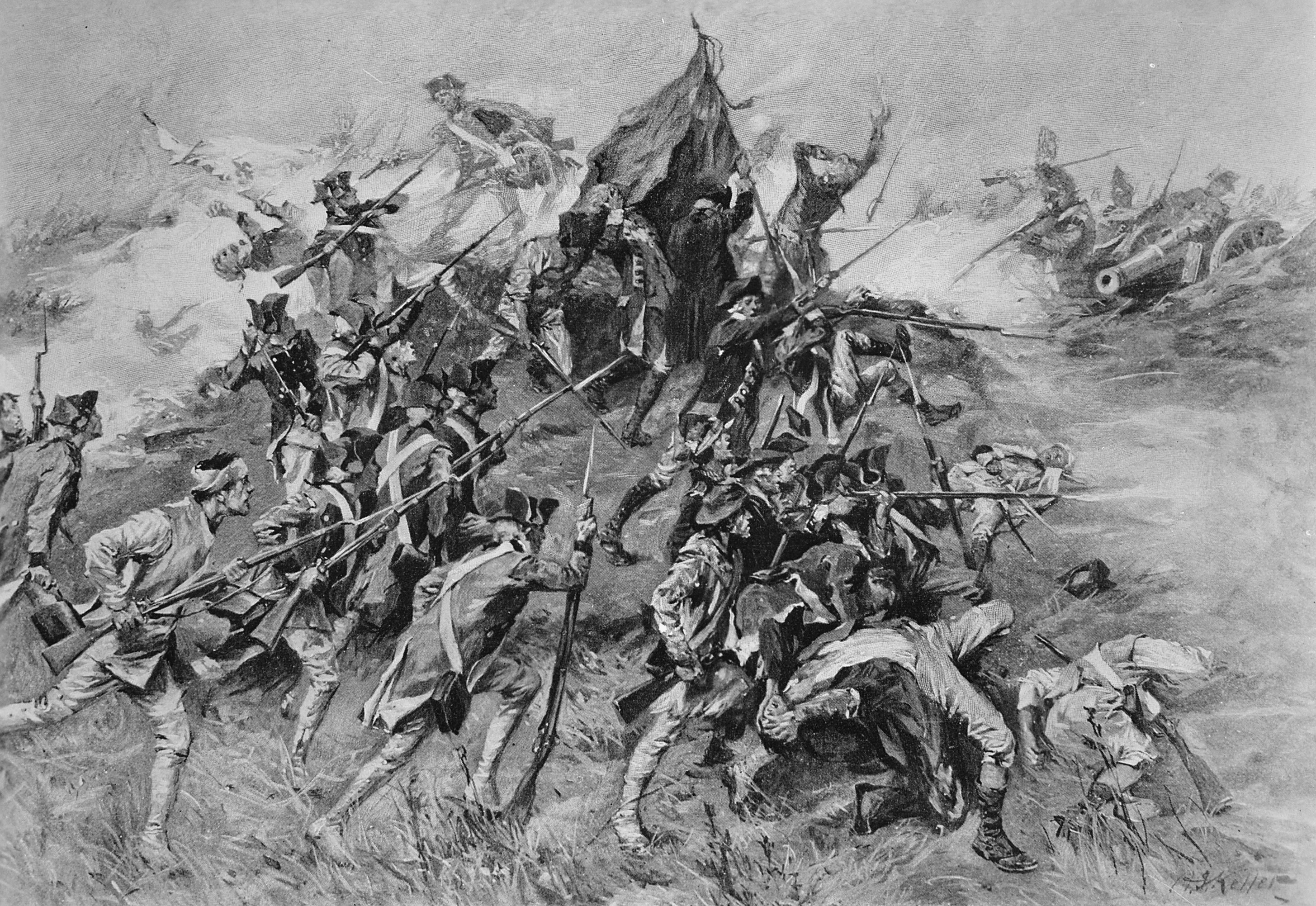
- American troops attacking British defenses during the Franco-American assault of 9 October
Date	16 September – 18 October 1779 (1 month and 2 days)
Location	Savannah, Georgia, United States
Result	British victory

Belligerents
United States (Kingdom of France) France	(Kingdom of Great Britain) Great Britain

Commanders and leaders
(United States) Benjamin Lincoln (United States) Lachlan McIntosh (United States) Casimir Pulaski † (Kingdom of France) Curt von Stedingk (Kingdom of France) Count of Estaing	(Kingdom of Great Britain) Augustine Prevost (Kingdom of Great Britain) John Maitland

Strength
Ground units: 7,722; Naval units: 42 ships	Ground units: 4,813; Naval units: 8 vessels

Casualties and losses
244 killed 584 wounded 120 captured	40 killed 63 wounded 52 missing

The siege of Savannah or the second battle of Savannah was an encounter of the American Revolutionary War (1775–1783) in 1779. The year before, the city of Savannah, Georgia, had been captured by a British expeditionary corps under Lieutenant-Colonel Archibald Campbell. The siege itself consisted of a joint Franco-American attempt to retake Savannah, from September 16 to October 18, 1779.

On October 9, 1779, a major assault against the British siege works failed. During the attack, Polish nobleman Count Casimir Pulaski, leading the combined cavalry forces on the American side, was mortally wounded. With the failure of the joint attack, the siege was abandoned, and the British remained in control of Savannah until July 1782, near the end of the war.

== Background ==
Following the failures of military campaigns in the northern United States earlier in the American Revolutionary War, British military planners decided to embark on a southern strategy to conquer the rebellious colonies, with the support of Loyalists in the South. Their first step was to gain control of the southern ports of Savannah, Georgia and Charleston, South Carolina. An expedition in December 1778 took Savannah with modest resistance from ineffective militia and Continental Army defenses.

There were many reasons why the British wanted to invade the Southern colonies. Although part of America, the Southern colonies tended to be more sympathetic to the British than to the Americans. The British were hoping that ordinary citizens of the Southern colonies would continue their support of the British army during the southern campaign, as they had in prior years. Moreover, the British were promising that any enslaved African Americans who fought for the British would be given freedom, which helped gain support for the British among southern slaves. Finally, the British wanted to gain control over the South for economic reasons. The South grew many profitable crops, such as rice, indigo, and tobacco. The American revolutionaries were using the money made from those crops to buy military supplies from Europe. Taking over the south would not only isolate New England, but also give the British access to those resources.

When British generals were scouting the coast, they spotted the first French ships sailing to Charleston, South Carolina. However, General Augustin Prevost mistakenly reported that the French ships had disappeared. He did not realize that the ships he saw were the faster ships of a group sent by French Admiral Charles Henri Hector, Count of Estaing to tell the American army they had arrived in Georgia. Prevost had been previously informed that a French army had arrived in Georgia. However, this information was not backed up by other intelligence. As a result, the British were unprepared for a possible French attack. Most of the British troops were in Beaufort or Sunbury, and fewer men were defending Georgia.

The Continental Army regrouped, and by June 1779 the combined army and militia forces guarding Charleston numbered between 5,000 and 7,000 men. General Benjamin Lincoln, commanding those forces, knew that he could not recapture Savannah without naval assistance; for this he turned to the French, who had entered the war as an American ally in 1778. Estaing spent the first part of 1779 in the Caribbean, where his fleet and a British fleet monitored each other's movements. He took advantage of conditions to capture Grenada in July before acceding to American requests for support in operations against Savannah. On September 3—an uncharacteristically early arrival as there was still substantial risk of seasonal hurricanes—a few French ships arrived at Charleston with news that Estaing was sailing for Georgia with twenty-five ships of the line and 4,000 French troops. Lincoln and the French emissaries agreed on a plan of attack on Savannah, and Lincoln left Charleston with over 2,000 men on September 11.

== Order of Battle ==
=== Allies ===
- Commanding General of Allied Forces, Major General Benjamin Lincoln

==== Continentals ====
- Artillery & Engineers, commanded by Colonel B. Beckman
  - 4th South Carolina Regiment of Continental Artillery (1 coy)
- 1st Brigade, commanded by Brigadier General Lachlan McIntosh
  - 3rd South Carolina Regiment (Rangers) – Cavalry (2 sqns)
  - 1st South Carolina Regiment – Infantry (1 small company)
  - 6th South Carolina Regiment (Rifles) – Riflemen (roughly one small coy)
- 2nd Brigade, commanded by Brigadier General Isaac Huger
  - 1st Virginia Detachment (4 coys) – Col. Richard Parker
  - Huger's Continental Regiment (4 coys)
  - Skirving's South Carolina Militia (2 coys)
  - Harden's South Carolina Militia (1 coy)
  - Garden's South Carolina Militia (1 coy)
- Georgia Militia Brigade, commanded by Brigadier General Lachlan McIntosh
  - Few's Georgia Militia (1 small coy)
  - Dooley's Georgia Militia (1 coy)
  - Twig's Georgia Militia (1 coy)
  - Middleton's Georgia Militia (1 extremely reduced coy)
- Charleston Militia
  - 2nd Militia Brigade commanded by Colonel M. Simmons (2 coys)
  - Light Troops commanded by Lieutenant colonel John Laurens (1 strengthened coy)

==== French ====
- Commanding General, Lieutenant-general Charles Henri Hector, Count of Estaing WIA
  - Chief Engineer, Captain Antoine O'Connor
- Vanguard of the Army, Col. Viscount Jules Béthisy WIA
  - Volunteer Grenadier Company, Capt. Aubery
  - Volunteer Grenadier Company, Capt. Herneville
  - Volunteer Grenadier Company, Capt. De Veone
  - Grenadier Company of Armagnac Regiment
  - Chasseur Company of Armagnac Regiment
  - Grenadier Company of Agénois Regiment
  - Chasseur Company of Gâtinais Regiment
- Right Column, Col. Count Arthur Dillon
  - Vanguard of the Right Column
    - Volunteer Grenadier Company, Capt. Moëdermotte
  - Battalion of Grenadiers
    - Grenadier Company of Auxerrois Regiment
    - Grenadier Company of Foix Regiment
    - Grenadier Company of Dillon's Regiment
    - Grenadier Company of Guadeloupe Regiment
    - Chasseur Company of Guadeloupe Regiment
  - Battalion of Grenadiers and Chasseurs
    - Grenadier Company of Cambrésis Regiment
    - Grenadier Company of Hainault Regiment
    - Chasseur Company of Champagne Regiment
    - Chasseur Company of Regiment du Cap
    - Chasseur Company of Port-au-Prince Regiment
    - Detachments of Dragoon Regiment Condé and of Dragoon Regiment Belsunce [dismounted]
- Left Column, Col. Baron Steding WIA
  - Regiment of Fusiliers
    - Fusilier Company of Armagnac Regiment
    - Fusilier Company of Auxerrois Regiment
    - Fusilier Company Foix Regiment
    - Fusilier Company of Dillon's Regiment
    - Fusilier Company of Walsh Regiment
  - Regiment of Fusiliers
    - Fusilier Company of Cambresis Regiment
    - Fusilier Company of Hainault Regiment
    - Fusilier Company of Regiment du Cap
    - Fusilier Company of Guadeloupe Regiment
    - Fusilier Company of Port-au-Prince Regiment
  - Detachments of Dragoon Regiment Condé and of Dragoon Regiment Belsunce [dismounted]
- Reserve Column, Maréchal de camp Viscount Louis Marie de Noailles
  - Reserve Corps
    - Troops drawn from left and right columns
    - Detachment from Metz Artillery Regiment
  - Troops Remaining Entrenched, Maj. Jean-Claude-Louis de Sablières
    - Detachment of Volunteer Chasseurs of San Domingo
    - Volunteer Grenadiers of San Domingo, Maj. Des Français
    - Detachment of Royal Corps of Marines
    - Chasseur Company of Martinique Regiment
    - Fusilier Company of Martinique Regiment
    - Detachments of Dragoon Regiment Condé and of Dragoon Regiment Belsunce [dismounted], M. Dejean
- Troops Remaining in the Batteries
  - Right Battery
    - Detachment of Royal Corps of Marine Infantry
  - Left Battery
    - Detachment from Metz Artillery Regiment
    - Detachment of Volunteer Chasseurs of San Domingo
  - Mortar Battary
    - Detachment of Bombardiers of the Navy
    - Detachment of Volunteer Chasseurs of San Domingo

=== British ===
- Commanding Officer, Major General Augustine Prevost
- 16th Regiment of Foot
- 71st Regiment of Foot (Fraser's Highlanders)
- South Carolina Dragoons (Provincial)
- New York Volunteers
- Royal North Carolina Regiment (Provincial)
- 1 Battalion from De Lancey's Brigade
- King's Rangers (South Carolinan, Provincial)
- 2 German Regiments
- South Carolina Loyalist Militia
- Georgia Loyalist Militia
- Detachment of His Majesty's Marine Forces
- Detachment of Naval gunners serving in the naval battery
- Artillery
  - 100 guns, howitzers, and mortars part of the Savannah Defences, including a naval battery

== Defence ==
=== British defenses ===
British troop strength in the area consisted of about 6,500 regulars at Brunswick, Georgia, another 900 at Beaufort, South Carolina, under Colonel John Maitland, and about 100 Loyalists at Sunbury, Georgia. General Augustine Prevost, in command of these troops from his base at Savannah, was caught unprepared when the French fleet began to arrive off Tybee Island near Savannah and recalled the troops stationed at Beaufort and Sunbury to aid in the city's defense.

Captain Moncrief of the Royal Engineers was tasked with constructing fortifications to repulse the invaders. Using 500–800 African-American slaves working up to twelve hours per day, Moncrief constructed an entrenched defensive line, which included redoubts, nearly 1,200 feet (370 m) long, on the plains outside the city.

==== Vessels ====
The Royal Navy contributed two aging warships, HMS Foley and HMS Rose, to the city's defence. They landed their guns and most of their men to reinforce the land forces. In addition, the British also deployed the armed brig HMS Keppel (1778) and the armed ship Germaine, the latter from the East Florida navy. There were two galleys, Comet and Thunder, also from East Florida. Lastly, the British armed two merchant vessels, Savannah and Venus.

== Siege ==
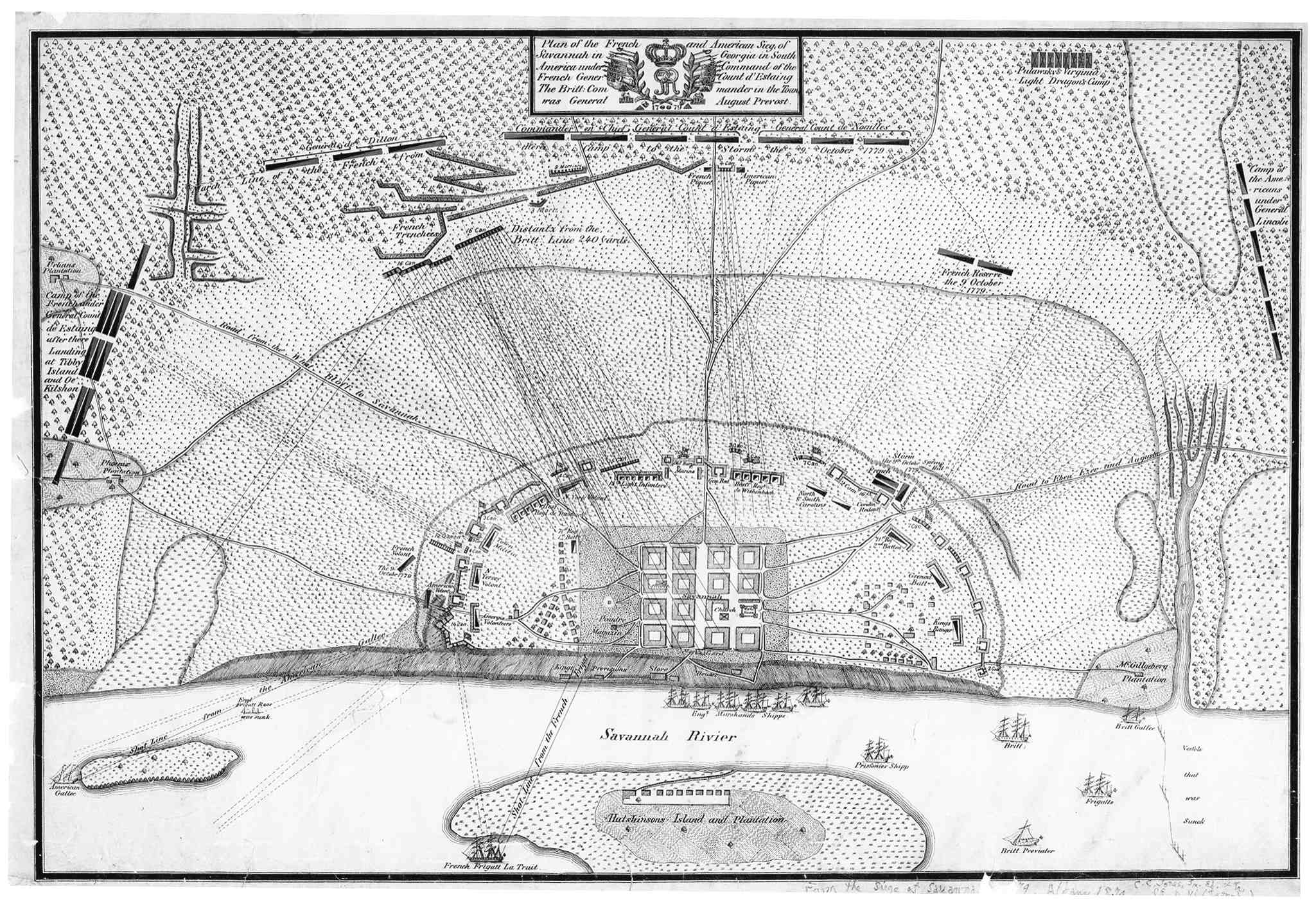
A map of the siege

Estaing began landing troops below the city on September 12, and began moving in by September 16. Confident of victory, and believing that Maitland's reinforcements would be prevented from reaching Savannah by Lincoln, he offered Prevost the opportunity to surrender. Prevost delayed, asking for 24 hours of truce. Owing to miscommunication about who was responsible for preventing Maitland's movements, the waterways separating South Carolina's Hilton Head Island from the mainland were left unguarded, and Maitland was able to reach Savannah hours before the truce ended. Prevost's response to Estaing's offer was a polite refusal, despite the arrival of Lincoln's forces.

On 19 September, as Charles-Marie de Trolong du Rumain moved his squadron up the river, he exchanged fire with Comet, Thunder, Savannah, and Venus. The next day the British scuttled Rose, which was leaking badly, just below the town to impede the French vessels from progressing further. They also burnt Savannah and Venus. By scuttling Rose in a narrow part of the channel, the British effectively blocked it. Consequently, the French fleet was unable to assist the American assault. Germaine took up a position to protect the north side of Savannah's defenses. Comet and Thunder had the mission of opposing any attempt by the South Carolinian galleys to bombard the town. Over the next few days, British shore batteries assisted Comet and Thunder in engagements with the two South Carolinian galleys; during one of these, they severely damaged Revenge.

Estaing, rejecting the idea of assaulting the British defenses, unloaded cannons from his ships and began a bombardment of the city. The city, rather than the entrenched defenses, bore the brunt of this bombardment, which lasted from October 3 to 8. "The appearance of the town afforded a melancholy prospect, for there was hardly a house that had not been shot through", wrote one British observer. The Franco-American bombardment killed numerous civilians; an American officer stated that "The poor women and children have suffered beyond description. A number of them in Savannah have already been put to death by our bombs and cannon", while one of Prevost’s aides commented that "Many poor creatures were killed trying to get to their cellars, or hide themselves under the bluff of the Savannah River." When the bombardment failed to have the desired effect, Estaing changed his mind, and decided it was time to try an assault. He was motivated in part by the desire to finish the operation quickly, as scurvy and dysentery were becoming problems on his ships, and some of his supplies were running low. While a traditional siege operation would likely have succeeded eventually, it would have taken longer than Estaing was prepared to stay.

=== Attack ===
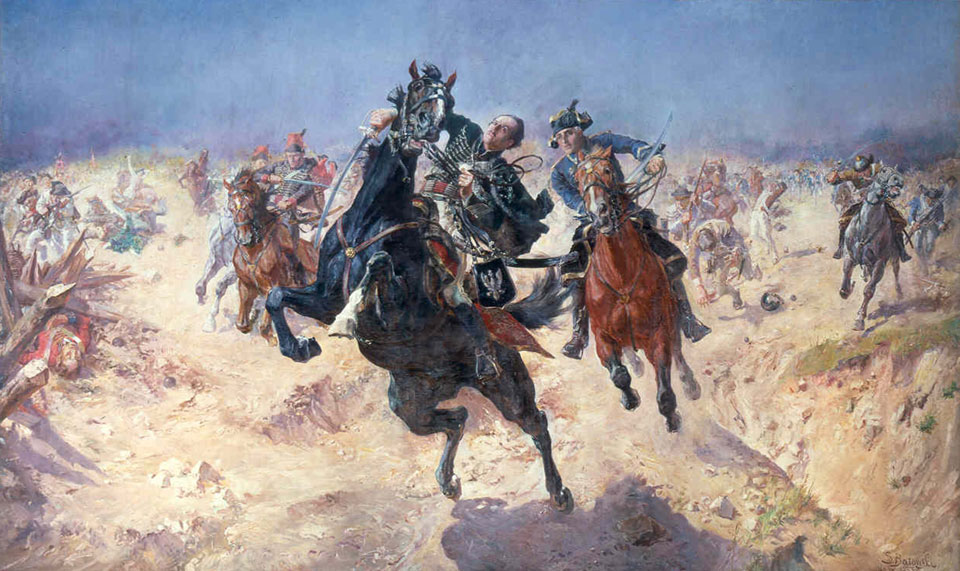
Pulaski at Savannah (Stanisław Kaczor-Batowski, 1931)

Against the advice of many of his officers, Estaing launched the assault against the British position on the morning of October 9. The success depended in part on the secrecy of some its aspects, which were betrayed to Prevost well before the operations were supposed to begin around 4:00 am. Fog caused troops attacking the Spring Hill redoubt to get lost in the swamps, and it was nearly daylight when the attack finally got underway. The redoubt on the right side of the British works had been chosen by the French admiral in part because he believed it to be defended only by militia. In fact, it was defended by a combination of militia and British regulars from Maitland's 71st Regiment of Foot, who had distinguished themselves at Stono Ferry. The militia included riflemen, who easily picked-off the white-clad French troops when the assault was underway. Estaing was twice wounded, and Polish cavalry officer Casimir Pulaski, fighting with the Americans, was mortally wounded. By the time the second wave arrived near the redoubt, the first wave was in complete disarray, and the trenches below the redoubt were filled with bodies. Attacks intended as feints against other redoubts of the British position were easily repulsed.

The second assault column was commanded by the Swedish Count Curt von Stedingk, who managed to reach the last trench. He later wrote in his journal, "I had the pleasure of planting the American flag on the last trench, but the enemy renewed its attack and our people were annihilated by cross-fire". He was forced back by overwhelming numbers of British troops, left with some 20 men—all were wounded, including von Stedingk. He later wrote, "The moment of retreat with the cries of our dying comrades piercing my heart was the bitterest of my life". After an hour of carnage, Estaing ordered a retreat. On October 17, Lincoln and Estaing abandoned the siege.

== Aftermath and legacy ==
The battle was one of the bloodiest of the war. While Prevost claimed Franco-American losses at 1,000 to 1,200, the actual tally of 244 killed, nearly 600 wounded and 120 taken prisoner, was severe enough. British casualties were comparatively light: 40 killed, 63 wounded, and 52 missing. Sir Henry Clinton wrote, "I think that this is the greatest event that has happened the whole war," and celebratory cannons were fired when the news reached London.

It was perhaps because of the siege's reputation as a famous British victory that Charles Dickens chose the siege of Savannah as the place for Joe Willet to be wounded (losing his arm) in the novel Barnaby Rudge.

Three currently-existing Army National Guard units (118th FA, 131st MP and 263rd ADA) are derived from American units that participated in the siege of Savannah. There are only thirty current U.S. Army units with lineages that go back to the colonial era.

=== Battlefield archaeology ===
In 2005, archaeologists with the Coastal Heritage Society (CHS) and the LAMAR Institute discovered portions of the British fortifications at Spring Hill, the site of the worst part of the Franco-American attack on October 9. The find represents the first tangible remains of the battlefield. In 2008, the CHS/LAMAR Institute archaeology team discovered another segment of the British fortifications in Madison Square. A detailed report of that project is available on line in pdf format from the CHS website. CHS archaeologists are currently finalizing a follow-up grant project in Savannah, which examined several outlying portions of the battlefield. These included the position of the Saint-Domingue reserve troops at the Jewish Burying Ground west of Savannah.

An archaeology presentation and public meeting took place in February 2011 to gather suggestions for managing Savannah's Revolutionary War battlefield resources. Archaeologist Rita Elliott from the Coastal Heritage Society revealed Revolutionary War discoveries in Savannah stemming from the two "Savannah Under Fire" projects conducted from 2007 to 2011. The projects uncovered startling discoveries, including trenches, fortifications, and battle debris. The research also showed that residents and tourists are interested in these sites. Archaeologists described the findings and explored ways to generate economic income which could be used for improving the quality-of-life of area residents.

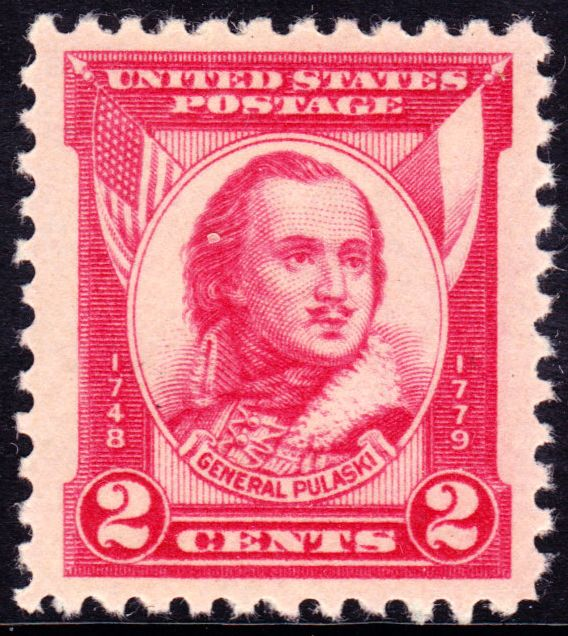
General Casimir Pulaski postage stamp, 1931 Issue, 2c

The battle is commemorated each year by Presidential proclamation, on General Pulaski Memorial Day.

=== Influence on Haitian revolutionaries ===
Approximately 545 soldiers of the Chasseurs-Volontaires de Saint-Domingue fought in the siege. The unit had been raised six months earlier and was led by white officers. Recruits came from the Black population of Saint-Domingue and included free people of color as well as slaves who were offered freedom in exchange for military service.

Henri Christophe, who later became the King of Haiti between 1811 and 1820, possibly served in the unit during the siege. Many other less-famous individuals from Saint-Domingue served in this regiment and formed the officer class of the rebel armies in the Haitian Revolution, especially in the northern province around today's Cap-Haïtien, where the unit was recruited.

== See also ==
- American Revolutionary War § War in the South. Places 'Siege of Savannah' in overall sequence and strategic context.
- Casimir Pulaski Monument in Savannah
- Scipio Handley, a Black Loyalist who participated in the battle
- William Jasper Monument
- Battle of the Rice Boats
- Elizabeth Lichtenstein Johnston
