= HMS Aldborough (1727) =

1727 sixth-rate frigate

History

Great Britain
- Name: HMS Aldborough
- Ordered: 27 April 1727
- Builder: Joseph Allin, Master Shipwright, Portsmouth Dockyard
- Laid down: 29 March 1727
- Launched: 21 October 1727
- Completed: 12 March 1728
- Commissioned: March 1728
- Out of service: 31 March 1742
- Fate: Broken up, Portsmouth Dockyard

General characteristics
- Class & type: 20-gun sixth-rate
- Tons burthen: 374 49/94 bm
- Length: 106 ft 0 in (32.3 m) (gundeck); 87 ft 9 in (26.7 m) (keel)
- Beam: 28 ft 4 in (8.6 m)
- Depth of hold: 9 ft 2 in (2.8 m)
- Propulsion: Sail
- Sail plan: ship-rigged
- Complement: 140
- Armament: 20 × 9-pdrs (upper deck)

HMS Aldborough was a 20-gun sixth-rate ship of the Royal Navy, built in 1727 according to the 1719 Establishment and in service in the West Indies, the North Sea and the Mediterranean until 1742. The future Admiral, Hugh Palliser, served aboard Aldborough as midshipman at the commencement of his naval career.

== Naval career ==
Aldborough was commissioned in March 1727 and assigned to survey work in the British West Indies. Her first captain was Edward Baker, who remained in command until early 1729 when he was replaced by John Gascoigne.

After seven years in the West Indies the ship was returned to Deptford Dockyard in 1734 for refit and repair. Aboard as passengers for this voyage were James Oglethorpe, the founder of the colony of Georgia, and a delegation of Yamacraw sent to meet with the British Government. Aldborough's years in tropical waters had taken their toll with extensive work required to restore her hull and timbers. Refitting continued until June 1735 at a cost of £5,417, more than two thirds of her original construction expense of £7,461.

Temporarily restored to seaworthiness, Aldborough was assigned to the command of Captain Nicholas Robinson and transferred to coastal patrol in the English Channel and North Sea. Robinson's 11-year-old nephew Hugh Palliser was also signed aboard as a midshipman from 1735. The ship remained in poor condition despite her recent refit, and was paid off for further repair in 1736.

Aldborough was refitted in 1737 as a fireship of 8 guns and 55 crew. In 1738 this designation was reversed, with Aldborough restored to the Navy lists as a 20-gun sixth rate and assigned to Mediterranean service under Captain George Pocock. She was immediately deployed as a privateer hunter, capturing a Spanish barque on 28 January 1739 and taking part in the capture of two more vessels in June. She was less successful in 1740, cruising for several weeks off the coast of Malta without encountering enemy craft. In January 1741 she was part of the British fleet at Port Mahon off the coast of Spain.

== Fate ==
Aldborough was broken up at Deptford Dockyard on 31 March 1742, in accordance with Admiralty orders that another ship of the same name be constructed in her place.

== Bibliography ==
- Winfield, Rif (2007). British Warships of the Age of Sail 1714–1792: Design, Construction, Careers and Fates. Seaforth. ISBN 9781844157006.
