= Josiah Tattnall Sr. =

British emigrant to colonial America (b. 1740)

Josiah Tattnall
- Born: 8 February 1740; Cheshire, England
- Died: 1811 (aged 70–71)
- Known for: Assisting the escape of royal Governor James Wright during the American Revolutionary War
- Spouse: Mary Tattnall
- Relatives: Josiah Tattnall Jr. (son); Josiah Tattnall III (grandson)

Josiah Tattnall (8 February 1740 – 1811) was a British emigrant to colonial America who became notable for his acts in support of the Crown during his time in Savannah, Province of Georgia.

== Early life ==
Tattnall was born in Cheshire, England, to Thomas and Elizabeth Tattnall (née Barnwell) in 1740. He left England for Charleston, South Carolina, in the mid-1700s. There, he married Mary Mullryne (19 October 1741 – 1781), the youngest daughter of Colonel John Mullryne and Claudia Cattell. He followed his father-in-law to Savannah, in the Province of Georgia, not long after Mullryne founded Bonaventure Plantation there in 1762. A son, John Mullryne Tattnall, was born in 1763. A second son, Josiah Jr., followed a year later at the plantation; he went on to become the 25th Governor of Georgia in 1801, two years before his death at the age of 38.

== Bonaventure Plantation ==
The first house on the plantation, made of English brick, was destroyed by a fire on 7 January 1771. John Berendt wrote in his 1994 book Midnight in the Garden of Good and Evil that a formal dinner party, held by either Mullryne or Tattnall, was in progress when one of the servants informed the host that the roof was ablaze and that nothing could be done to stop it. The host "rose calmly, clinked his glass, and invited guests to pick up their dinner plates and follow him into the garden", where they ate the remainder of their meals in the glow of the flames. The house was replaced by a mansion, also made of brick. This also burned down, in 1804.

== Revolutionary War ==
During the Revolutionary War, when Savannahians ousted and arrested royal Governor James Wright in February 1776, Mullryne and Tattnall aided his escape through Bonaventure to HMS Scarborough, a British naval vessel nearby.

After their actions in support of the Crown (then King George III), an order was made from the Revolutionary government for their arrest and deportation from Georgia. Both Mullryne (to Nassau in the Bahamas) and Tattnall (to London, England) subsequently fled the country. The Bonaventure estate was confiscated by the government in 1782 and sold at public auction to John Habersham, a friend of the Tattnalls, who sold the property in 1788 to Josiah Tattnall Jr., who had married two years earlier. Tattnall was provided with three grandchildren between 1788 and 1795. All three came to live with him in London, England, after the deaths of their mother and father in 1802 and 1803, respectively. One of them, the third Josiah Tattnall, became a Commodore in the United States Navy.

== Death ==
It is believed Tattnall died in 1811, aged 70 or 71.
