= Henry Parker (Georgia official) =

Colonial Governor of the state of Georgia

Governor of Georgia
- In office 1751–1752
- Monarch: George II
- Preceded by: William Stephens
- Succeeded by: Patrick Graham

Personal details
- Born: c. 1690 Savannah, Georgia
- Died: c. 1777 Isle of Hope, Georgia
- Profession: Bailiff, governor

Henry Parker (born near Savannah, Georgia, about 1690; died Isle of Hope, Georgia, about 1777) was secretary to the (governor) of Georgia 1750 until 1751. He was Colonial Governor of the state of Georgia from 1751 until 1752.

== Biography ==
He was the bailiff of Savannah in 1734, whose office was identical to that of magistrate, and shortly afterward, he colonized the Isle of Hope. When the province was divided into two counties in 1741, he became an assistant to Sir William Stephens, president of the Savannah Province, succeeding him in 1750. In that year, he presided over the first assembly in Georgia, in which the executive and the members addressed each other according to parliamentary formalities. When the province surrendered the charter in 1754, he resigned from the governorship and retired to his plantation on Isle of Hope, where he died at an advanced age.

== See also ==
- List of colonial governors of Georgia
