= William Stephens (colonial administrator) =

Governor of Georgia
- In office 1743–1751
- Monarch: George II
- Preceded by: James Oglethorpe
- Succeeded by: Henry Parker

Personal details
- Born: 28 January 1671 Isle of Wight, England
- Died: 1753 Georgia
- Profession: Statesman

William Stephens (January 28, 1671 – 1753), of Bowcombe, near Newport, Isle of Wight, and later Beaulieu, Savannah, Georgia, was an English Tory politician who sat in the House of Commons from 1702 to 1727. He emigrated to Georgia and was governor of the Province of Georgia between 1743 and 1751.

== Early life ==
William Stephens was born on the Isle of Wight, England, to Elizabeth and Sir William Stephens, where his father was lieutenant governor. He was educated at the Winchester School, and at King's College, Cambridge. He then studied law at the Middle Temple but did not pass the bar. In 1696, he married Mary Newdigate, and the couple had nine children. He succeeded his father in 1697 but the family estates were heavily encumbered with debt.

== Career ==
At the 1702 English general election, Stephens was elected Member of Parliament for Newport (Isle of Wight). He voted for the Tack in 1704. He was returned again at the 1705 English general election and voted against the Court candidate for Speaker on 25 October 1705. At the 1708 British general election he was returned again as a Tory for Newport. He voted against the impeachment of Dr Sacheverell in 1710. He was returned again at the 1710 British general election when there was a Tory landslide. He was listed as one of ‘Tory patriots’ who opposed the continuation of the war in 1711, and as a ‘worthy patriot’ who helped expose the mismanagements of the previous administration in 1711. He was also a member of the October Club and acted twice as a Tory teller. His financial affairs were in a parlous state and he was soliciting Harley for a government post. Eventually in 1712 he was appointed a commissioner for victualling the navy with a salary of £500 p.a. He voted for the French commerce bill on 18 June 1713. In 1714, on the accession of King George I, he lost his post.

Stephens retained the Newport seat at the 1715 British general election on his own interest and voted against the Administration in all recorded divisions. Having subsequently lost his electoral interest at Newport to the Government, at the 1722 British general election was returned instead for Newtown by Sir Robert Worsley. He did not stand for parliament in 1727 and in 1728 was financially ruined by extravagance. He sold all his property and absconded, until his friends found him the job of agent for the York Buildings Company in North Scotland at a salary of £200 p.a. He was invited to stand for Newport in 1732, but declined. In 1735, he lost his job as agent in Scotland when company sold their assets. In 1736, he went to the Province of Carolina at the request of Samuel Horsey.

== Political life in Georgia ==
The first settlers had embarked for Georgia in November 1732 and arrived on 1 February 1733 led by James Oglethorpe. The initial optimism of a new colony did not last. Oglethorpe may have been pleased with the colony's progress so far, but the trustees disagreed. Growing frustration with Oglethorpe's brief and infrequent reports led to the appointment of Stephens as secretary to the board of trustees of the Province of Georgia.

Stephens landed in Savannah on November 1, 1737, and began to settle disputes among the colonists. He stayed several years in this capacity. Serving the state and the Trustees faithfully for years, through it all – good, bad, and ordinary – William Stephens remained president of Georgia. He attended almost every meeting of the president and assistants from when he was first appointed in October 1741 until his removal in September 1750, and he took a genuine interest in their proceedings.

== Death and legacy ==
At almost 80 years old, Stephens was forced to retire in 1750 by his age, his colleagues and his health. The Trustees turned Georgia affairs over to Henry Parker, although Stephens technically continued to hold the post of president until April 1751. To satisfy the role of secretary, the Trustees chose James Habersham. With his son, Newdigate, Stephens moved out to his plantation at Beaulieu (or Bewlie, as Stephens referred to it, after Beaulieu in Hampshire) in mid-1750 and disappeared from public life. Less than three years later, he died of the illnesses associated with old age, apparently in 1753, although the details of death recorded by his son (including the date and descriptions of Stephens' condition) are, according to his biographer Julie Anne Sweet, somewhat fanciful.

Parliament of England
Preceded by Colonel James Stanhope; Edward Richards	Member of Parliament for Newport (Isle of Wight); 1702–1707; With: Major-General The Lord Cutts	Succeeded by Parliament of Great Britain
Parliament of Great Britain
Preceded by Parliament of England	Member of Parliament for Newport (Isle of Wight); 1707–1722; With: Sir Tristram Dillington 1707-1710; Lieutenant-General John Richmond Webb 1710; Lieutenant-General William Seymour 1710-1713; General John Richmond Webb1713-1715; Anthony Morgan 1715-1717; Lieutenant-General James Stanhope 1717; Lieutenant-Colonel Sir Tristram Dillington 1717-1721; Thomas Stanwix 1721-1722	Succeeded by Earl of March; The Lord Whitworth
Preceded by James Worsley; Sir Robert Worsley	Member of Parliament for Newtown; 1722–1727; With: Charles Worsley	Succeeded by James Worsley; Thomas Holmes
