= Josiah Tattnall (politician) =

American politician (1762–1803)

United States Senator from Georgia
- In office February 20, 1796 – March 3, 1799
- Preceded by: George Walton
- Succeeded by: Abraham Baldwin

25th Governor of Georgia
- In office November 7, 1801 – November 4, 1802
- Preceded by: David Emanuel
- Succeeded by: John Milledge

Member of the Georgia House of Representatives
- In office 1795-1796

Personal details
- Born: c. 1762 Savannah, Georgia Province
- Died: June 6, 1803 (aged 41) Nassau, British West Indies
- Party: Democratic-Republican
- Relatives: Harriet Tattnall (wife); Josiah Tattnall Sr. (father); Josiah Tattnall III (son)

Josiah Tattnall (also known as Josiah Tattnall Jr.; c. 1762 – June 6, 1803) was an American planter, soldier and politician from Savannah, Georgia. He represented Georgia in the U.S. Senate from 1796 to 1799, and was the 25th governor of Georgia in 1801 and 1802. Born at Bonaventure Plantation, on the outskirts of Savannah, in the early 1760s (he was the first native-born Georgian governor after the state was admitted into the Union) to Mary Mullryne and Josiah Tattnall, he studied at Eton School before joining Anthony Wayne's troops at Ebenezer during the American Revolutionary War. After the war, he was elected brigadier general of the 1st Regiment in the Georgia Militia. He helped to rescind the Yazoo land fraud of 1795.

== Early life ==
Tattnall was born in 1762, to Josiah and Mary Tattnall (née Mullryne), at Bonaventure Plantation in colonial Savannah, Georgia. His father had inherited the plantation upon his marriage into the Mullryne family — its 1762 founder being Colonel John Mullryne.

Mullryne, who also built the third Tybee Lighthouse in 1773, established a small family graveyard on the grounds, which eventually formed the nucleus of the present-day Bonaventure Cemetery. Bonaventure was one of the largest structures in the colony of Georgia.

Tattnall and his family left Georgia at the outbreak of the American Revolutionary War. After living in the Bahamas for six years, the family later moved to England, where Tattnall attended Eton School. Although firm in supporting the British crown, he was unwilling to take up arms against the colonies and refused an appointment to the British navy.

== Revolutionary War ==
Around 1782, the Tattnall family returned to Georgia. Josiah Tattnall joined the Continental Army under General Anthony Wayne, helping remove Savannah from British rule. After the war, Tattnall bought back a portion of Bonaventure from John Habersham and continued his interest in the military. He commanded the Georgia militia in 1787 and led troops against the Creek Indians in 1788 and 1793. He was captain of the Chatham Artillery, the oldest militia unit in Georgia, and later colonel of an infantry regiment. President George Washington nominated him for marshal of Georgia in 1794. He was promoted to brigadier general shortly before his election as governor in 1801.

== Political life ==
Tattnall served his state as a member of the Georgia General Assembly from 1795 to 1796. He was a member of the Jeffersonian Republican national party, as most Georgia politicians (including such notables as John Milledge, William Stephens, Edward Telfair, Abraham Baldwin, George Troup, William Bulloch, and, later, William H. Crawford) were during this time. He was also a Jacksonian, a follower and supporter of James Jackson. Tattnall and Jackson both opposed the Yazoo land scandal, the massive real estate fraud led by Georgia governor George Mathews and the General Assembly that rocked early Georgia politics. Jackson resigned his position as U.S. senator to return to the Georgia General Assembly, where he and Tattnall led the campaign against the sale of the Yazoo lands. After the Rescinding Act of 1796 was passed, Tattnall was elected by the General Assembly to take Jackson's Senate seat, where he served from 1796 to 1799.

After serving in the U.S. Senate, Tattnall returned to Georgia and to his beloved Bonaventure. He was elected governor, but only served for one year. During his administration, the University of Georgia (formerly Franklin College) moved to its present campus in Athens, and the Hawkins Line was run by Benjamin Hawkins, establishing Georgia's northern border with the Cherokee Nation. Tattnall wrote a letter to President Thomas Jefferson in 1802, seeking guidance on the situation. The Western border with the Creeks was yet to be solidified, as evidenced by a letter from the Justices of the Inferior Court and Justices of the Peace for Camden County, Georgia, on June 12, 1802. They wrote on behalf of the inhabitants of the county regarding the recent removal of U.S. troops from stations in the area. They note that Camden County is a frontier county that is exposed not only to attacks from the sea, and from Spanish settlements to the south, but also to attacks by neighboring Indians, and they express concern that the area is no longer defended against the Indians.

== Personal life ==
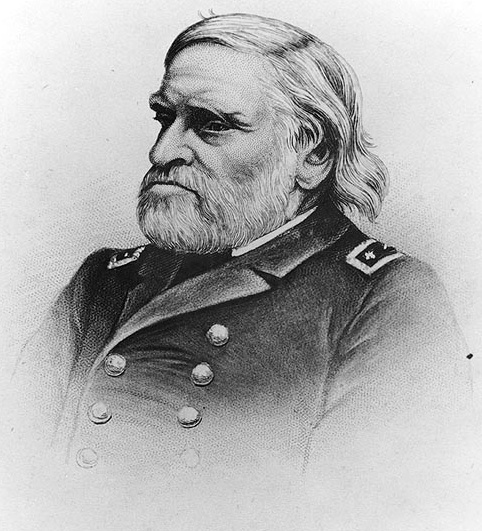
Tattnall's son, Josiah, in the early 1800s

Tattnall was married to Harriet Fenwick, originally from Charleston, South Carolina. The couple had several children, but only three lived to adulthood. Their son, Josiah Tattnall III, was a U.S. Navy officer for more than fifty years and a navy officer for the Confederate Navy during the Civil War. Another son, Edward, became a politician, soldier and lawyer.

== Death ==
Tattnall died in exile in Nassau, New Providence. His last request was that he be buried at Bonaventure. His wish was granted; he was interred in the Tattnall family plot (section E, lot 1), alongside his wife, who preceded him in death by a few months.

=== Legacy ===
Georgia's Tattnall County was named for him, as was Savannah's Tattnall Street.

U.S. Senate
Preceded by George Walton	U.S. senator (Class 2) from Georgia; 1796–1799; Served alongside: James Gunn	Succeeded by Abraham Baldwin
Political offices
Preceded by David Emanuel	Governor of Georgia; 1801–1802	Succeeded by John Milledge
