= Trustees for the Establishment of the Colony of Georgia in America =

Colonial committee

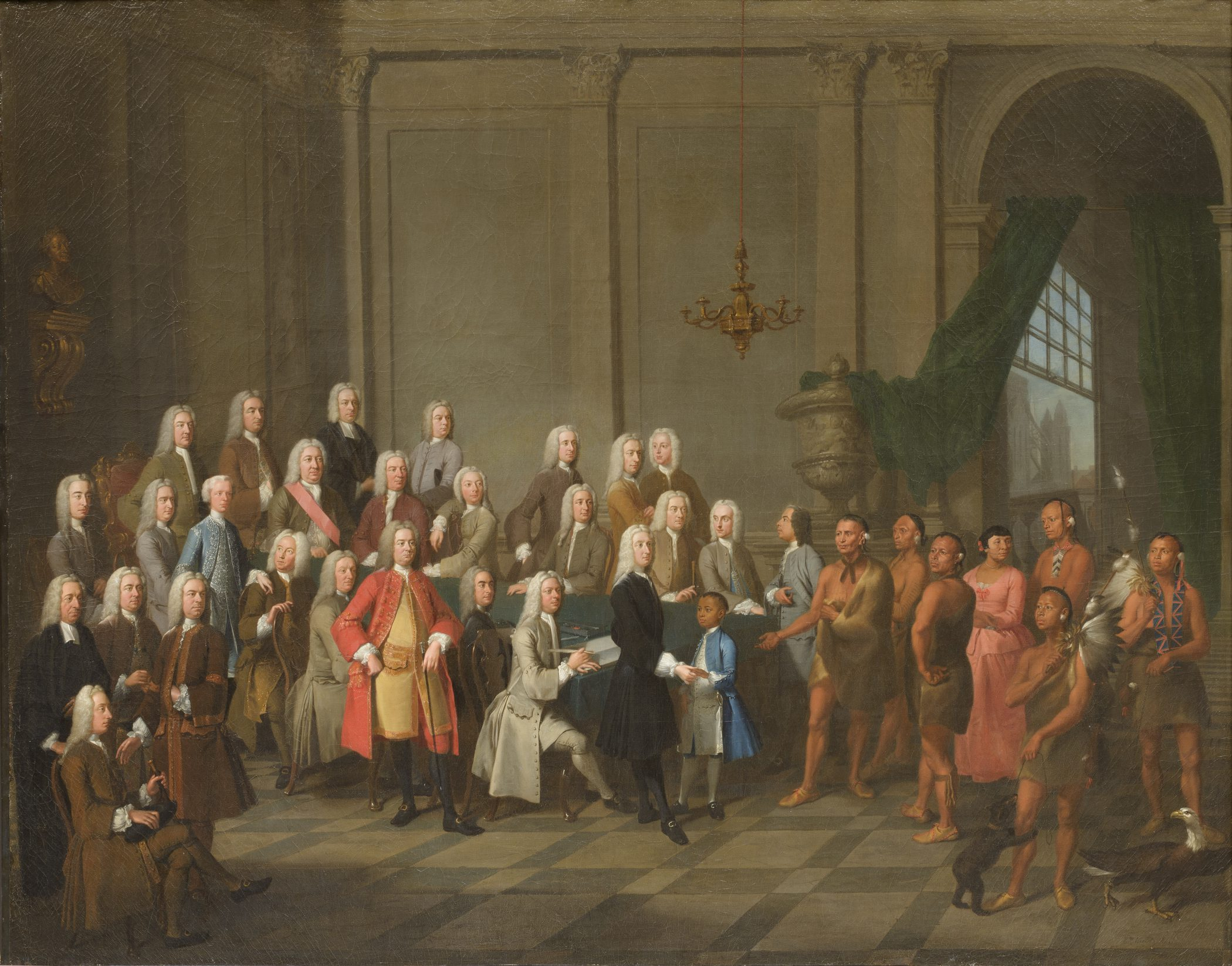
Audience Given by the Trustees of Georgia to a Delegation of Creek Indians (William Verelst, 1734)

The Trustees for the Establishment of the Colony of Georgia in America, or simply the Georgia Trustees, was a body organized by James Edward Oglethorpe and associates following parliamentary investigations into prison conditions in Britain. After being granted a royal charter in 1732, Oglethorpe led the first group of colonists to the new colony, arriving there in February, 1733. The trustees governed Georgia, one of the Thirteen Colonies, from its founding until 1752, a period known as Trustee Georgia.

== Background ==
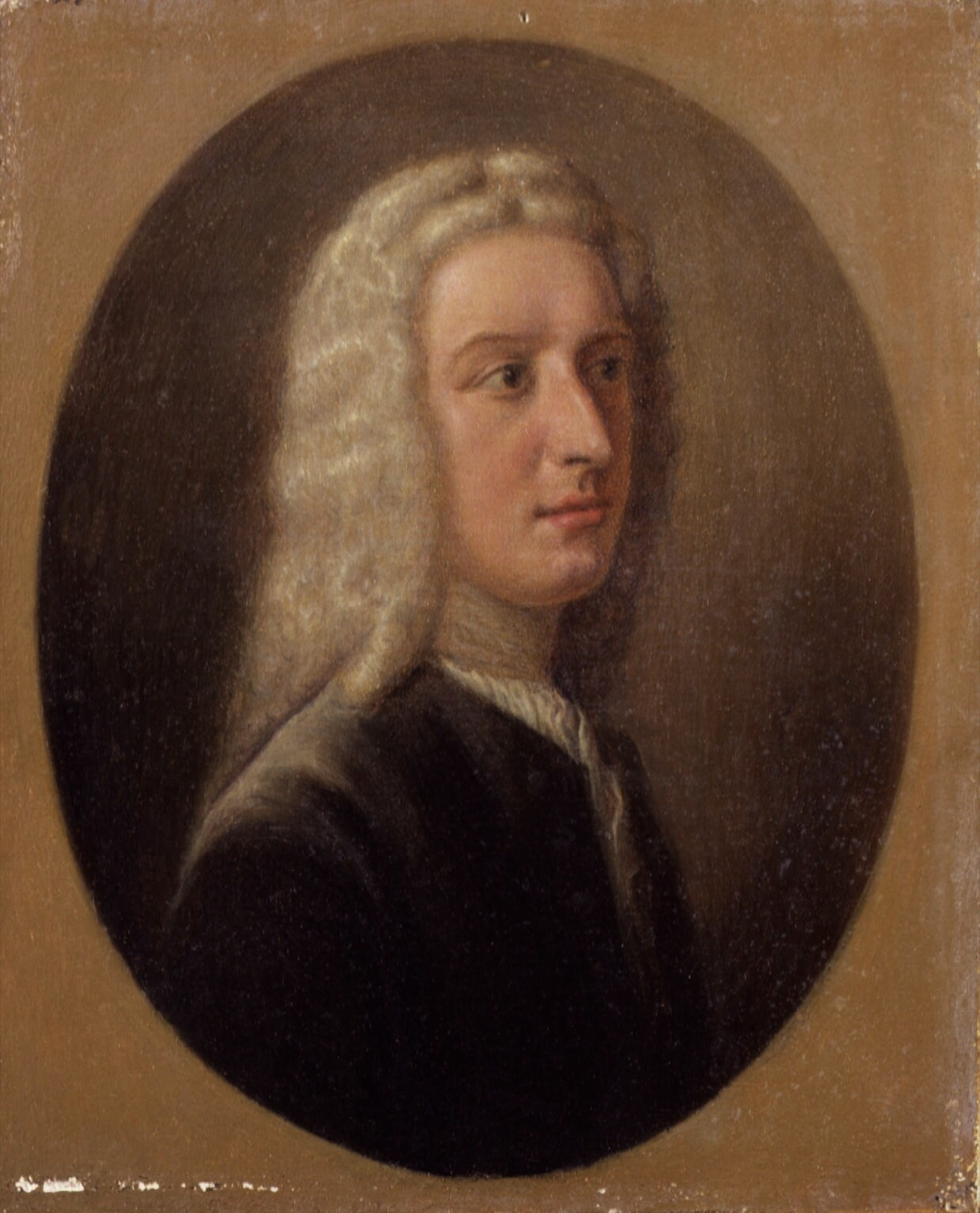
James Edward Oglethorpe

Parliament established a committee to investigate prison conditions in February, 1729 and Oglethorpe was appointed chair. The work of the committee resulted in the release of prisoners onto the streets of London and other cities without prospect of employment, and Oglethorpe conceived the idea of a colony as a means of productively employing such people. The plan for the colony quickly broadened in scope to encompass several philanthropic and strategic purposes. Funds from the D'Allone Legacy provided early financing for the Georgia Trust.

Dr. Thomas Bray, a supporter of prison reform, invited Oglethorpe to use an organization he created some years earlier, known as the Associates of Dr. Bray, as the entity through which he might apply for a royal charter for the new colony. Oglethorpe expanded the group to include members of the prison committee and other social reformers. Bray died in February 1730, and Oglethorpe became the driving force behind the organization, which would soon give birth to the Georgia Trustees.

The organization petitioned for a royal charter in July, 1731, which was signed by George II in April, 1732. After passing through government ministries, the charter reached the trustees in June, 1732.

== Settlement of Georgia ==
Oglethorpe personally led the first group of colonists to the new colony, departing England on November, 1732 and arriving at the site of present-day Savannah, Georgia on February 12, 1733 O.S. The founding of Georgia is celebrated on February 1, 1733 N.S., the date corresponding to the modern Gregorian calendar adopted after the establishment of the colony.

Oglethorpe and other Georgia Trustees developed an elaborate plan for settlement of the Georgia Colony. Now known as the Oglethorpe Plan, it specified how towns and regions would be laid out, how property would be equitably and sustainably allocated, and how society would be organized to defend itself on a perilous frontier.

Though Oglethorpe and others wanted debtors' prisoners to inhabit the new colony of Georgia, the Crown determined otherwise. The colony would become a military buffer for South Carolina against the Spanish and some Creek factions. Each of the new "Georgians" was chosen for their work skills, which would best contribute to the colony. The men were trained and made members of the militia for the defense of Georgia and South Carolina.

Most of the 114 traveled with wives, children and servants. Dr William Cox, appointed medical doctor for the colony, brought his wife Elizabeth, son, William, a young daughter and a male servant. In an early letter to the trustees, Dr Cox said: "the greatest health hazard in Savannah is alligators in the streets". However, Dr Cox was the first to die (after 59 days) from the real health hazard, that of consumption (i.e. tuberculosis), for which he had treated many colonists immediately after arrival. Dr Cox was buried with "the highest military honors" by Oglethorpe. His family returned to England, but his son William, only 11 years old, stayed and apprenticed to help build Bethesda, America's oldest orphanage.

The trustees governed the Georgia colony from its founding in 1733 until June 28, 1752 O.S., a period known as Trustee Georgia.

== List of Georgia Trustees ==
The Georgia Trustees:

=== Trustees named in the royal charter, effective June, 1732 ===
- Adam Anderson
- William Belitha (resigned)
- Rev. Richard Bundy (died before 1740)
- George, Lord Carpenter (died 1749)
- Thomas Coram (died 1751)
- Hon. Edward Digby
- Francis Eyles MP
- George Heathcote MP
- Rogers Holland MP
- Robert Hucks (brewer and MP) (died 1745)
- John LaRoche MP (died 1752)
- Robert More MP
- James Oglethorpe MP
- John, Viscount Percival (later Earl of Egmont) (died 1748)
- William Sloper MP (died 1743)
- Thomas Tower MP
- Hon. James Vernon

=== Trustees appointed at the first annual meeting in March, 1733 ===
- Richard Chandler
- Anthony Ashley Cooper, 4th Earl of Shaftesbury
- James Darcy, 2nd Baron Darcy of Navan (died 1733)
- James Stanley, 10th Earl of Derby (died 1736)
- Sir Thomas Frederick, 3rd Baronet
- Sir John Gonson
- William Hanbury
- William Heathcote (died 1751)
- Robert Kendall (Sheriff of London)
- Henry L'Apostre
- James, Viscount Limerick
- John Page MP (died 1779)
- Sir Erasmus Philipps, 5th Baronet (died 1743)
- Christopher Tower MP
- John, Viscount Tyrconnel MP
- George Tyrer (Mayor of Liverpool, 1736) (died 1740)
- John White MP

=== Trustees appointed at later annual meetings ===
1734: Rev. Dr. Thomas Rundle (Bishop of Derry, died 1743), Hon. William Talbot, Richard Coope, William Wollaston MP, Hon. Robert Eyre, Thomas Archer MP, Robert Tracy (MP), Hon. Henry Archer (MP), Francis Wollaston (d.1774)

1737: Sir Jacob Bouverie, 3rd Baronet (later Viscount Folkestone)

1738: Sir Henry Gough, 1st Baronet , Sir Roger Burgoyne, 6th Baronet

1739: Lord Sidney Beauclerk (died 1744)

1741: Hon. Henry Bathurst, Hon. Philip Perceval (brother of the Earl of Egmont), Sir John Frederick, 1st Baronet (brother of Thomas Frederick, deceased Trustee)

1742: Hon. Alexander Hume Campbell, Sir John Barrington, 7th Baronet, Samuel Tuffnell MP, Sir Henry Calthorpe, KB

1743: Sir John Philipps, 6th Baronet, Velters Cornewall, John Wright (died 1748)

1745: Rev. Dr. Thomas Wilson

1747: Francis Cokayne (Lord Mayor of London), Samuel Lloyd (silk merchant)

1749: John Perceval, 2nd Earl of Egmont, Anthony Ewer, Edward Hooper, Sir John Cust, 3rd Baronet, Slingsby Bethell, Stephen Theodore Janssen (Lord Mayor of London)

1752: Richard Cavendish

== Employees and officials of the trustees ==
London: Benjamin Martyn, Secretary; Harman Verelst, Accountant

Savannah: William Stephens, Secretary, later President of Savannah County and President of the Georgia colony. Numerous others served in various positions for shorter periods.

== Revival of the Georgia Trustees ==
The concept of the Georgia Trustees was reconstituted in 2008 by the Georgia Historical Society under the suggestion of the Executive Vice-President Laura Garcia-Culler. Each year during the Georgia Historical Society Gala, two new members of the Georgia Trustees are admitted as members by the Georgia Historical Society in conjunction with the Governor's Office. These new members are chosen for their dedication, commitment, and contributions to the State of Georgia.

2009: Margeurite Neel Williams (entrepreneur), Bernard Marcus (Home Depot founder)

2010: Hank Aaron (baseball player), Ted Turner (CNN founder and Chairman of Turner Enterprises, Inc.)

2011: Vincent J. Dooley (UGA Football Coach), Samuel A. Nunn, Jr. (former US Senator)

2012: Tom Cousins (Atlanta real estate developer and sports franchise owner), Andrew Young (former UN Ambassador, Mayor of Atlanta, US Congressman and civil rights leader)

2013: Truett Cathy (founder of Chick-fil-A), Herman J. Russell (founder of H.J. Russell & Company)

2014: Arthur Blank (Home Depot Co-Founder), Billy Payne (Chairman of the Augusta National Golf Club, Chairman of Centennial Holding Company, LLC)

2015: Alana Shepherd (co-founder of the Shepherd Center), Paula Wallace (President and co-founder of the Savannah College of Art and Design)

2016: James Blanchard (retired Chairman of the Board and CEO, Synovus), Muhtar Kent (Chairman of the Board and Chief Executive Officer, The Coca-Cola Company)

2017: F. Duane Ackerman (retired Chairman and CEO, BellSouth), A.D. "Pete" Correll (1941 – 2021, Former Chairman of Grady Memorial Hospital and Georgia-Pacific)

2018: Ed Bastian (CEO, Delta Air Lines), Paul Bowers (Chairman, President & CEO, Georgia Power)

2019: Frank Blake (retired Chairman and CEO, The Home Depot), John Schuerholz (Vice Chairman Emeritus of the Atlanta Braves)

2020: Robert L. Brown, Jr. (President and CEO of R.L. Brown & Associates, Inc.), Robert S. Jepson Jr. (founder and CEO of Jepson Associates, Inc.)

2021: David Abney (former Executive Chairman of United Parcel Service), Juanita Baranco (Executive Vice President and COO of Baranco Automotive Group)

2022: Dan Cathy (Chairman of Chick-fil-A, Inc.), Shirley Franklin (former Mayor of Atlanta)

2023: Dan Amos (Chairman and CEO of Aflac), Donna Hyland (CEO of Children's Healthcare of Atlanta)

2024: Louis W. Sullivan (17th Secretary of the United States Department of Health and Human Services, founding Dean of the Morehouse School of Medicine), Carol Tomé (CEO of United Parcel Service (UPS))

2025: Walter M. “Sonny” Deriso, Jr. (Banker, Attorney, and Civic Leader, Craig Menear (Former Chairman and Chief Executive Officer of The Home Depot)

2026: Saxby Chambliss (Former U.S. Senator), Chris Womack (Chairman, President, and CEO of Southern Company)
