= Thomas Archer (disambiguation) =

Thomas Archer (1668–1743) was an English architect and courtier.

Thomas Archer may also refer to:

- Thomas Archer (MP for Warwickshire) (1619–1685), English soldier and politician
- Thomas Archer, 1st Baron Archer (1695–1768), English politician and nobleman
- Thomas Archer (actor) (died 1848), English actor
- Thomas Archer (divine) (1554–1630?), English Anglican divine
- Thomas Archer (MP for Lincoln) (fl. 1415–1417), English politician, Member of Parliament for the city of Lincoln
- Thomas Archer (American politician) (c. 1808–1870), American politician
- Thomas Croxen Archer (1817–1885), English-born, Scotland-based botanist and museum director
- Thomas Archer (pastoralist) (1823–1905), Scottish-born Australian pioneer pastoralist and Agent General of Queensland
- Thomas Andrew Archer (1853–1905), English historian
- Thomas Archer, a character in Already Dead

== See also ==
- Tommy Archer (born 1954), American racing driver
- Archer family
- Thomas L'Archer (died 1329), English monk and prior of the Knights Hospitaller
- Tom Archer, a character in The Archers
