= Baranco =

Baranco is a surname. Notable people with the surname include:

- Juanita Baranco (born 1949), American corporate executive
- Wilbert Baranco (1909–1983), American musician

== See also ==
- Branco (surname)
