= William Keyt =

William Keyt may refer to:

- Sir William Keyt, 2nd Baronet (1638–1702), of the Keyt baronets
- Sir William Keyt, 3rd Baronet (1688–1741)
