= Lord Archer =

Lord Archer may refer to:

- Baron Archer, a hereditary title that was created in 1747 and became extinct in 1778
  - Thomas Archer, 1st Baron Archer (1695–1768)
  - Andrew Archer, 2nd Baron Archer (1736–1778)
- Peter Archer, Baron Archer of Sandwell (1926–2012), English lawyer and Labour politician
- Jeffrey Archer, Baron Archer of Weston-super-Mare (1940–2026), English novelist and Conservative politician

== See also ==
- Mary Archer, Baroness Archer of Weston-super-Mare (born 1944), British chemist and administrator
