= Keyt =

Keyt or KEYT may refer to:

- George Keyt, Sri Lankan painter
- Keyt baronets in 17th–18th century England
- KEYT-TV, a television station in California
