= Grady Newsource =

News source based out of University of Georgia's Grady College journalism school

Grady Newsource is a news source based out of University of Georgia's Grady College journalism school.
