= Henry Wilmot, 1st Earl of Rochester =

English Cavalier

Lieutenant-General The Right Honourable Henry Wilmot
- Earl of Rochester
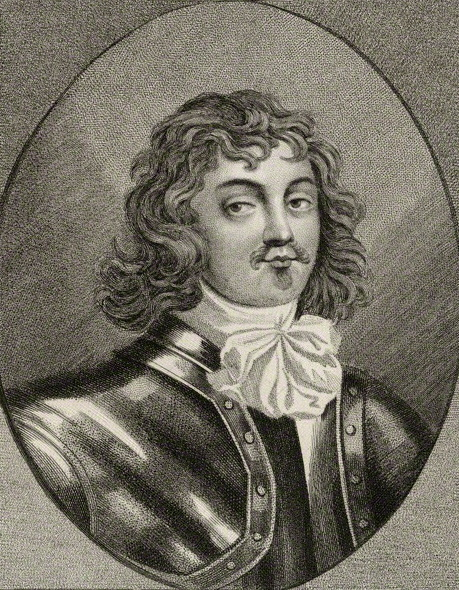
- Tenure: 1652–1658 (Earl of Rochester); 1644–1658 (Viscount Wilmot); 1643–1658 (Baron Wilmot)
- Predecessor: New creation (Earl of Rochester and Baron Wilmot); Charles Wilmot, 1st Viscount Wilmot (Viscount Wilmot)
- Successor: John Wilmot, 2nd Earl of Rochester
- Other titles: Viscount Wilmot; Baron Wilmot
- Born: 26 October 1612
- Died: 19 February 1658 (aged 45)
- Spouses: Frances Morton (m. 1633, died) Anne St John (m. 1644)
- Issue: John Wilmot, 2nd Earl of Rochester

Lieutenant-General Henry Wilmot, 1st Earl of Rochester (26 October 1612 – 19 February 1658), known as The Lord Wilmot between 1643 and 1644 and as The Viscount Wilmot between 1644 and 1652, was an English Cavalier who fought for the Royalist cause during the Wars of the Three Kingdoms.

== Early life ==
Wilmot's family was descended from Edward Wilmot of Witney, Oxfordshire, whose son Charles Wilmot, 1st Viscount Wilmot had served with distinction in Ireland during Tyrone's Rebellion at the beginning of the 17th century, and was president of Connaught from 1616 until his death. In 1621, Charles had been created an Irish peer as Viscount Wilmot. Wilmot was born in 1612 as the third son of Charles, but he was the only one still alive on his father's death so he succeeded to the title.

== 1630s and early 1640s ==
Wilmot had five years experience in the Dutch army, and was badly wounded at the siege of Breda. He joined Charles I for the Bishops' Wars (1639–1640) and served as an officer in the cavalry, sitting in the Royal Council of War. He led a cavalry charge at Battle of Newburn, which was initially successful, but he was captured by the Scots when it broke.

In 1640, Wilmot was elected to the Long Parliament to represent Tamworth. It was during this period that he became involved as a member of a set of young MPs and officers around Queen Henrietta Maria, (a patron who would help him later in his life). As part of this set, he took an active part in the Army Plot of 1641 against Parliament. He was committed to the Tower of London and expelled from the House of Commons.

== First Civil War ==
As soon as the First English Civil War started Wilmot joined King Charles I at York. By 5 August 1642, he raised a regiment of horse for the King's army and regained the post of commissary-general of horse. He was wounded at Battle of Powick Bridge on 23 September, the first major skirmish of the Civil War, but was fit enough to lead the left wing of the royalist cavalry at the Battle of Edgehill a month later, routing most of the Parliamentarians opposite to him. He also commanded the expeditionary force that stormed and captured Marlborough on 5 December.

Reward for these exploits was lavishly given in April 1643 when he was appointed lieutenant-general of horse in the king's army directly under the command of Prince Rupert of the Rhine and on 29 June when he was created Baron Wilmot of Adderbury, Oxfordshire; these honours may well have been assisted by the restored influence of his old patroness, the queen. Later that year he commanded a large cavalry contingent that was sent to help the western royalist army, and on 13 July he defeated Sir William Waller at the Battle of Roundway Down opening the way for the royalists to solidify their position in the west.

In 1644 when Rupert took over a regional command in the North, Wilmot stepped into his shoes as commander of all the Royalist cavalry and as the dominant influence on military matters. On 29 June at the Battle of Cropredy Bridge he participated in defeating Waller for the second time, but not before he had had to lead a charge, in which he was wounded and briefly taken prisoner.

When his father died (shortly before April 1644), Wilmot inherited the title of Viscount Wilmot of Athlone and much of his father's political standing in Ireland. In April he was, jointly with Thomas Dillon, 4th Viscount Dillon, made Lord President of Connaught, a post that his late father had held jointly with the late Viscount Ranelagh since 1630; this appointment laid the foundations for his becoming a major political figure in both England and Ireland.

All recognised that Wilmot was popular with the soldiers he commanded, due to a "mixture of courage, enterprise, and boozy affability" Clarendon famously, if waspishly, noted "He was a man proud and ambitious, and incapable of being contented; an orderly officer in marches and governing his troops. He drank hard, and had a great power over all who did so, which was a great people". This popularity and his central position in the army command, allowed him to start to exert political influence. In June Wilmot felt in a strong enough position to canvas support in the army to ask the king to dismiss his two principal civilian advisers, Lord Digby and the Chancellor of the Exchequer, Sir John Culpeper, and to adopt the strategy of a march on London. Charles, who had no personal affection for Wilmot (because Wilmot had voted for the death of the Earl of Strafford), dismissed the strategy and retained Digby and Culpeper as his advisers.

With the failure of his first scheme, Wilmot made an unauthorized contact with the Earl of Essex who was the Parliamentarian commander-in-chief, to see if a peace could be arranged. The king was easily persuaded by Digby and Culpeper that Wilmot's actions were treasonable. Wilmot was arrested on 8 August 1644, stripped of all his offices, and incarcerated in Exeter. His popularity within the army led many of its officers to petition on his behalf and eventually to placate them, all charges against Wilmot were dropped on the understanding that he would retire overseas. Wilmot went to France, to join the exiled court of his old patron Queen Henrietta Maria.

Three years later, when Digby arrived in Paris, the dispute between the men was neither forgotten nor forgiven and they fought a duel. Wilmot was defeated with a stab through the hand.

== Third Civil War ==
After Charles I was executed in January 1649, Wilmot became a gentleman of the bedchamber of King Charles II. He was greatly trusted by Charles II, whose defeat at the Battle of Worcester and subsequent wanderings Wilmot shared. During these, whereas the king adopted a series of disguises (often as a servant), Wilmot disdained disguise and declined to travel on foot. He and the king ultimately escaped to France six weeks after the battle, having spent the intervening time in hiding in various places.

== Interregnum ==
Wilmot was one of Charles II's principal advisers during the former's exile, being created by him Earl of Rochester in 1652. In the interests of Charles, he visited the emperor Ferdinand III, Nicholas II, Duke of Lorraine, and Frederick William, Elector of Brandenburg. In March 1655, he was in England, where he led an unsuccessful attempt at a rising on Marston Moor, near York as part of the Sealed Knot Penruddock uprising. The York uprising was put down by Colonel Robert Lilburne Governor of York and on its failure, Wilmot fled the country again.

In April 1656 along with the Duke of Ormonde he signed the Treaty of Brussels, which secured an alliance between the exiled Royalists and the Spanish King. In 1656, Wilmot obtained command of an English foot regiment in the royalist army in Bruges, thus becoming the first colonel of the Grenadier Guards. The unhealthy and overcrowded conditions of the regiment's quarters in the winter of 1657–58 caused many in it to fall sick, including its commander. Wilmot died at Sluys on 19 February and was buried at Bruges.

After the Restoration, his body was transferred to the family vault at Spelsbury church, Oxfordshire. He was succeeded by his son John Wilmot, 2nd Earl of Rochester, a noted poet and libertine at the Restoration court.

== Family ==
On 21 August 1633, Wilmot married Frances Morton, daughter of Sir George Morton of Winterborne Clenston, Dorset. In 1644, some time after Frances had died, Wilmot married Anne Lee, daughter of Sir John St John, 1st Baronet St John of Lydiard Tregoze, and widow of Sir Francis Henry Lee, 2nd Baronet Lee of Quarendon. They had a son John, who was born on 10 April 1647. John inherited his father's title and went on to become a well-known raconteur, wit and poet at the court of Charles II.

== Notes ==
Parliament of England
Preceded by Sir Simon Archer; George Abbot	Member of Parliament for Tamworth; 1640–1641; With: Ferdinando Stanhope	Succeeded by George Abbot; Sir Peter Wentworth
Government offices
Preceded by The Viscount Wilmot	Lord President of Connaught; 1644–? with Sir Charles Coote	Unknown
Peerage of England
New creation	Earl of Rochester; 1652–1658	Succeeded by John Wilmot
New creation	Baron Wilmot; 1643–1658	Succeeded by John Wilmot
Peerage of Ireland
Preceded by Charles Wilmot	Viscount Wilmot; 1644–1658	Succeeded by John Wilmot
