= Harry Chapman =

Harry Chapman may refer to:

== Sportsmen ==
- Harry Chapman (baseball) (1887–1918), American baseball catcher
- Harry Chapman (footballer, born 1880) (1880–1916), English footballer
- Harry Chapman (footballer, born 1997), English footballer

== Others ==
- H. E. Chapman (Harry Ernest Chapman, c. 1871–1944), Chief Constable of Kent, 1921–1940
- Harry Chapman (news anchor), American news anchor
