= George Abbot (author) =

English religious writer and politician (1604–1649)

George Abbot or Abbott (1604 – 2 February 1649) was an English lay writer, known as "The Puritan", and a politician who sat in the House of Commons in two periods between 1640 and 1649. He is known also for his part in defending Caldecote House against royalist forces in the early days of the English Civil War.

== Life ==
Abbott was the son of George Abbott of York (died 1607) and his wife Joan Penkeston. While Alumni Cantabrigienses states that he matriculated at King's College, Cambridge in 1622, the Oxford Dictionary of National Biography discounts the identification, for lack of evidence. He owned property in Baddesley Clinton, Warwickshire, and was a good friend of Richard Vines, minister at Caldecote some way to the east. In April 1640, he was elected as a member of parliament (MP) for Tamworth in the Short Parliament.

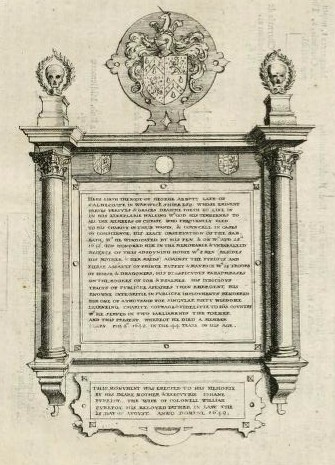
Memorial tablet to George Abbot in Caldecote Church, 1656 engraving

In the English Civil War, Abbot worked closely in Warwickshire with his stepfather William Purefoy, and made a notable defence, with his mother Joan, of the Purefoy house at Caldecote, Warwickshire, gaining the family coverage in the London press. On 15 August 1642, with eight men, his mother and maids, he held out for a time against Prince Rupert of the Rhine, with about 18 troops of horses and dragoons. In the aftermath of the Battle of Edgehill, in October of the same year, Richard Baxter moved to Coventry, and Abbot was one of those hearing him preach there. Baxter in writing on the Sabbath referred to "my dear friend Mr. George Abbot". In his memoirs Reliquiæ Baxterianæ, Baxter placed Abbot's defence of Caldecote House, where barns were burnt, in local context: royalists under Spencer Compton, 2nd Earl of Northampton were attacking Warwick Castle, defended by John Bridges, and Coventry, defended by John Barker.

Abbot was re-elected MP for Tamworth in 1645 for the Long Parliament and held the seat until his death in 1649. He died unmarried in his 44th year, and was buried in Caldecote church where his monument describes his defence of Caldecote.

== Legacy ==
By his will, Abbot endowed a free school at Caldecote. It was supported by land left to it at Baddesley Ensor.

== Works ==
Abbot was a lay theologian and scholar. His Whole Booke of Job Paraphrased, or made easy for any to understand (1640), was written in a terse style, and his Vindiciae Sabbathi (1641) influenced the Sabbatarian controversy. His The Whole Book of Psalms Paraphrased (1650) was published posthumously by Richard Vines, and dedicated to Joan Purefoy, his mother.

== Mistaken identifications ==
Abbot has been confused with others of the same name and has been described as a clergyman, which he never was. His writings have been incorrectly attributed in some bibliographical authorities to a relation of George Abbot the archbishop of Canterbury. One of the sons of Sir Morris Abbot called George was also an MP in the Long Parliament but for the constituency of Guildford.

== Notes ==
Parliament of England
Vacant Parliament suspended since 1629	Member of Parliament for Tamworth; 1640; With: Simon Archer	Succeeded by Ferdinando Stanhope; Henry Wilmot
Preceded by Ferdinando Stanhope; Henry Wilmot	Member of Parliament for Tamworth; 1645–1649; With: Peter Wentworth	Not represented in Rump Parliament
