= Henry W. Grady College of Journalism and Mass Communication =

Constituent college of the University of Georgia in Athens, Georgia

- Type: Public college
- Established: 1915; 111 years ago
- Parent institution: University of Georgia
- Dean: Charles N. Davis
- Faculty: 78
- Students: 1,697 (2017)
- Undergraduates: 1,493 (2017)
- Postgraduates: 204 (2017)
- Location: Athens, Georgia, U.S.
- Website: grady.uga.edu

The Grady College of Journalism and Mass Communication is a constituent college of the University of Georgia, a public land-grant research university, with the college's campus in Athens, Georgia, United States. Established in 1915, Grady College offers undergraduate degrees in journalism, advertising, public relations, and entertainment and media studies, and master's and doctoral programs of study. Grady has been ranked among the top five schools of journalism education and research in the U.S.

The college is home to several prominent centers, awards, and institutes, including the Peabody Awards, recognized as one of the most prestigious awards in electronic journalism, the McGill Medal for Journalistic Courage, the James M. Cox Jr. Center for International Mass Communication Training and Research, the Center for Advanced Computer-Human Ecosystems, the New Media Institute, and National Press Photographers Association.

== History ==
In 1915, Grady was founded as a school of journalism by Steadman Vincent Sanford, a young professor who later as president (1932–35) and chancellor (1935–45) of the University System of Georgia, was the architect of the modern University of Georgia. Classes were first held in the Academic Building near the university's iconic Arch just off Broad Street. Early courses included newspaper reporting and correspondence, editorial writing, history and principles of journalism, psychology of business procedure and newspaper advertising. In 1921, the school's name was changed to the Henry W. Grady School of Journalism in honor of university alumnus Henry W. Grady, an Athens native who argued for the need for white supremacy in the post–Civil War South, who helped reintegrate the states of the Confederacy into the Union after the American Civil War, and who served as part-owner and managing editor of the Atlanta Constitution in the 1880s.

A Grady reporting class in 1941

Grady's first graduate, in 1921, Lamar Trotti, became a producer of major motion pictures for 20th Century Fox. He received an Academy Award for Writing Original Screenplay in 1945 for Wilson. The second graduate, in 1922, John Eldridge Drewry, became the school's longest serving director and dean (1932–69), and created a national reputation for the school. In 1940, Drewry established the George Foster Peabody Awards to address the fact that Columbia University, home of the Pulitzer Prize, did not accept radio broadcast entries (Peabody Awards for television were introduced in 1948 and categories for material distributed via the World Wide Web were added in the 1990s). By 1929, enrollment at Grady, which had moved into the south wing of the Commerce-Journalism Building the previous year, was nearly 70 students and included 20 women who graduated with bachelor's degrees in journalism. A master's degree program was authorized in 1938.

In 1961, Charlayne Hunter-Gault, along with Hamilton E. Holmes, became the first two African-American students to desegregate the University of Georgia. In 1963, Hunter-Gault graduated with a journalism degree from Grady and went on to a notable career in multimedia news reporting. The current Journalism Building located just north of Sanford Stadium was dedicated in 1969. A doctoral program was established in 1983. Two years later, the James M. Cox Jr. Center for International Mass Communication Training and Research began operations and has since conducted hundreds of training programs involving countries across the world, and published numerous research and technical reports. The New Media Institute was founded in 2000 to explore the creative, critical and commercial implications of emerging digital communication technologies. In 2015, the National Press Photographers Association moved its headquarters to Grady.

== Academics ==
Grady comprises three academic departments: journalism, advertising and public relations, and entertainment and media studies. Admission to the undergraduate program is selective and open to students who have completed their sophomore year. The college provides instruction at the undergraduate and graduate levels in a range of subject areas including public relations, advertising, broadcast and multimedia journalism, photojournalism, new media, communication, publication management, media innovation and entrepreneurship, and screenwriting.

Experiential learning through capstone courses like Grady Newsource; study-abroad experiences like Cannes-Lions and Choose China; and involvement with clubs like Talking Dog and PRSSA, provide experiences beyond the classroom. Many students work on the award-winning, independent student newspaper, The Red and Black, and its lifestyle publication, Ampersand Magazine, as well as the student-operated WUOG, a radio station broadcasting to Athens and surrounding areas.

=== Degrees offered by the college ===
- Bachelor of Arts in Journalism (A.B.J.)
- Bachelor of Arts in Advertising (A.B.)
- Bachelor of Arts in Public Relations (A.B.)
- Bachelor of Arts in Entertainment and Media Studies (A.B.J.)
- Master of Arts in Journalism (M.A.)
- Master of Arts in Advertising (M.A.)
- Master of Arts in Public Relations (M.A.)
- Master of Arts in AdPR 4+1 (M.A.)
- Master of Arts in Mass Media Studies (M.A.)
- Master of Arts in Health and Medical Journalism (M.A.)
- Master of Arts in Emerging Media (M.A.)
- Master of Fine Arts in Film, Television and Digital Media (M.F.A.)
- Master of Fine Arts in Narrative Media Writing (M.F.A.)
- Master of Fine Arts in Screenwriting (M.F.A.)
- Doctor of Philosophy in Mass Communication (Ph.D.)

=== Certificates offered by the college ===
- Grady Sports Media Certificate
- New Media Institute Certificate
- Media Analytics Certificate
- Public Affairs Professional Certificate

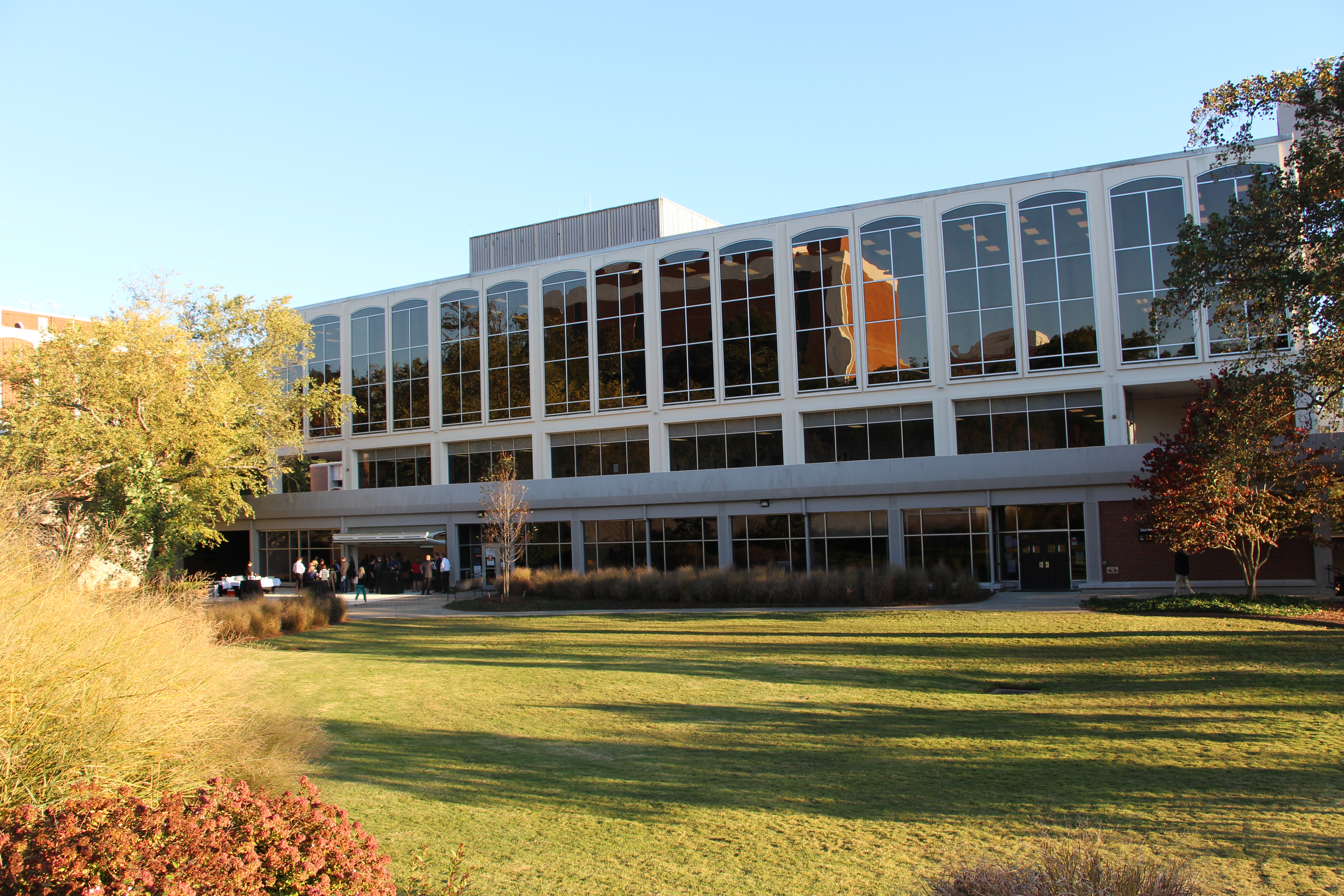
Journalism Building, Grady College of Journalism and Mass Communication

== Research programs ==
Grady houses the following centers, institutes and affiliates for research and education:

- Center for Advanced Computer-Human Ecosystems
- Center for Health and Risk Communication
- George Foster Peabody Awards
- Georgia Scholastic Press Association
- James M. Cox Jr. Center for International Mass Communication Training and Research
- James M. Cox Jr. Institute for Journalism Innovation, Management and Leadership
- New Media Institute
- National Press Photographers Association
- Peabody Media Center

== Peabody Awards ==
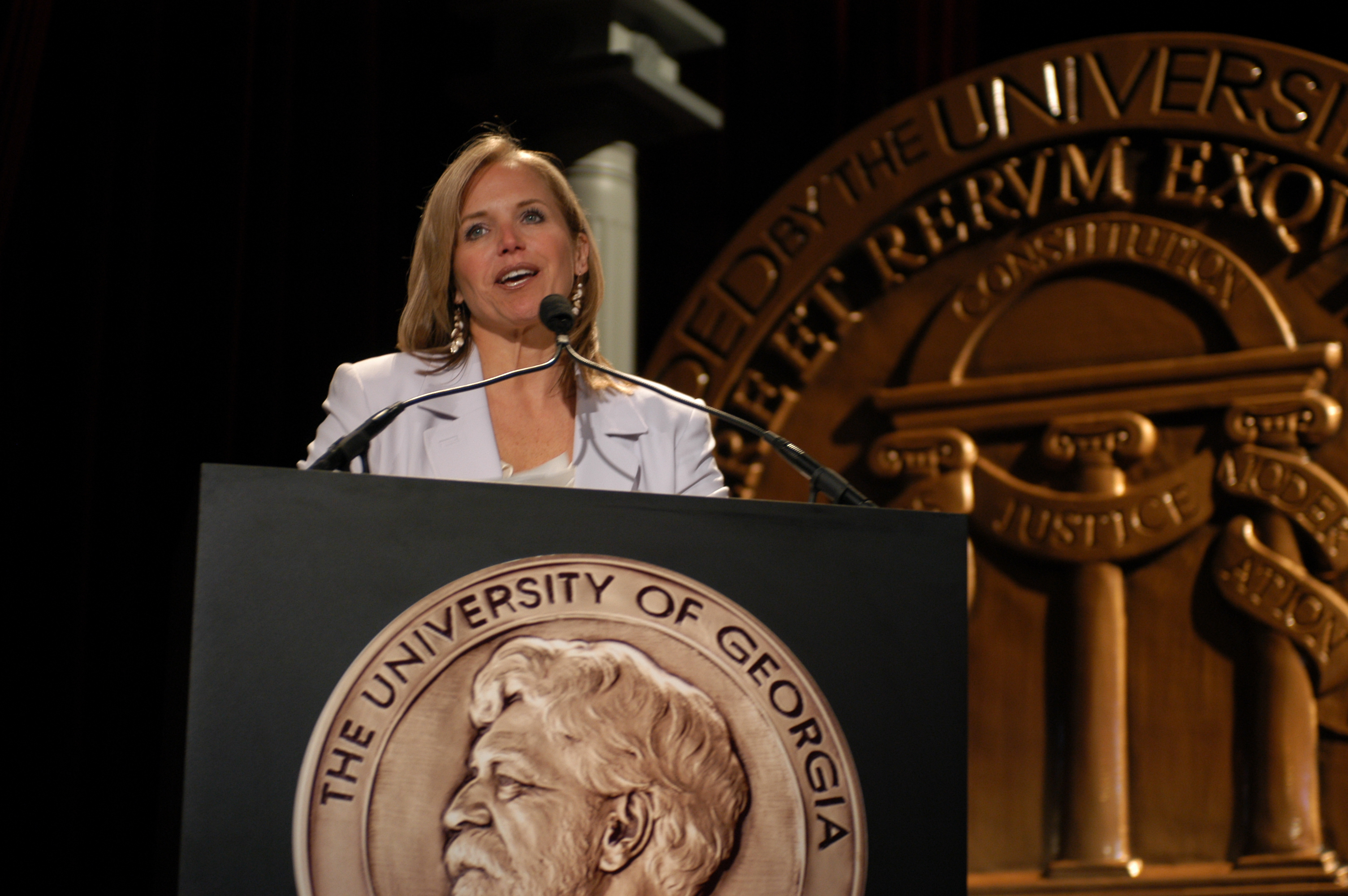
Katie Couric hosting the 63rd annual Peabody Awards luncheon in 2004 at the Waldorf Astoria Hotel in New York City

In 1938, leaders of the National Association of Broadcasters asked Lambdin Kay, WSB station manager in Atlanta, to create an award for excellence in broadcasting. He turned to Drewy, Grady's dean, for sponsorship. The result was the creation in 1940 of the George Foster Peabody Awards, named after a benefactor to the University of Georgia. The next year, the Peabody Awards were first presented to six distinguished radio winners at the Commodore Hotel in New York City. Grady has since administered the award to recognize outstanding achievements in radio, television and digital media.

More than a thousand submissions are judged annually by the Peabody Board of Jurors, made up of respected media professionals, media scholars, critics and journalists. The board meets at least three times, with the final viewing and discussion session held at the university. To win a Peabody in one of about 30 categories, ranging from news, entertainment and public service to documentary, children's and web/interactive programming, a program must receive the unanimous approval of all board members. Past Peabody winners include Edward R. Murrow, Walter Cronkite, Barbara Walters, BBC, 60 Minutes and Al Jazeera.

== Accreditation ==
Grady is accredited by the Accrediting Council on Education in Journalism and Mass Communications.

== Notable alumni ==
The following is a list of some notable alumni in the fields of journalism, media and communication:

- Lamar Trotti (1922) – Academy Award-winning motion picture producer
- Eugene Patterson (1943) – Pulitzer Prize-winning editor of Washington Post
- Edwin Pope (1948) – Miami Herald sports columnist
- Gene Methvin (1955) – Reader's Digest senior editor
- Donald A. Davis (1962) – New York Times author; UPI correspondent
- Charlayne Hunter-Gault (1963) – Peabody Award and Emmy Award-winning reporter
- Tom Johnson (1963) – chief executive, CNN and Los Angeles Times; White House Fellow
- Harry Chapman (1967) – longtime WTVF news anchor in Nashville, Tennessee
- John Holliman (1970) – CNN war correspondent
- John Huey (1970) – Time Inc. editor-in-chief, columnist
- Maxine Clark (1971) — founder of Build-A-Bear
- Brenda Hampton (1972) – creator and executive producer, 7th Heaven and The Secret Life of the American Teenager
- Kathy Trocheck (1976) – a.k.a. Mary Kay Andrews, New York Times best-selling author
- Bonnie Arnold (1977) – film producer, Walt Disney Feature Animation, Pixar and DreamWorks Animation
- Deborah Blum (1977) – Pulitzer Prize-winning science writer
- Ed Grisamore (1978) – The Telegraph columnist; Will Rogers Humanitarian Award recipient
- Ernie Johnson Jr. (1978) – sportscaster, Turner Sports and CBS Sports
- Doreen Gentzler (1979) – longtime WRC-TV news anchor in Washington, D.C.
- Deborah Norville (1979) – host of Inside Edition; former CBS News anchor; former Today co-host
- Steve Oney (1979) – journalist and author
- Martha Zoller (1979) – syndicated radio host, television personality and writer
- Deborah Roberts (1982) – ABC News television journalist
- Jackie Crosby (1983) – Pulitzer Prize-winning journalist
- Lewis Grizzard (1984) – syndicated Atlanta Journal-Constitution columnist; Chicago Sun-Times editor
- Julie Moran (1984) – first female host of ABC's Wide World of Sports; former Entertainment Tonight host
- Chip Caray (1987) – sports broadcaster
- Mark B. Perry (1989) – Primetime Emmy Award-winning television producer and writer
- Amy Robach (1995) – television journalist for ABC News, Good Morning America
- Ryan Seacrest (dropped out, honorary 2016) – television producer; radio personality; host of American Idol and Live with Kelly and Ryan
- Mark Schlabach (1997) – ESPN sportswriter
- Brooke Anderson (2000) – CNN anchor and producer; Entertainment Tonight correspondent
- Mary Katharine Ham (2002) – CNN and Fox News Channel contributor
- Nancy Mace (2004) – U.S. Congresswoman representing South Carolina's 1st Congressional District
- Maria Taylor (2009) – sports journalist, ESPN and SEC Network
- Monica Pearson (2014) – WSB-TV news anchor in Atlanta, Georgia

== Literature ==
- Clark, E. Culpepper. 2015. Centennial: A History of Henry W. Grady College of Journalism and Mass Communications at the University of Georgia. Mercer University Press.
