= Simon Archer (antiquary) =

English antiquary

Sir Simon Archer (21 September 1581 – before 4 June 1662) was an English antiquary and politician who sat in the House of Commons in 1640.

== Life ==
Archer was the eldest son of Andrew Archer (1554–1629) of Umberslade Hall, near Tanworth in Arden, Warwickshire. His arms are blazoned: Azure three arrows or. Like his father, he expanded the family estate. He was knighted on 21 August 1624 at Warwick Castle.

In 1626, Archer was appointed High Sheriff of Warwickshire and, in April 1640, elected as Member of Parliament for Tamworth in the Short Parliament. He remained neutral in the English Civil War in 1642, but two of his sons fought on the Parliamentary side. From 1644 he himself served on the parliamentarian subcommittee for accounts in Warwickshire, which served as a curb on the more militant members of the county committee. In the 1650s, he was active as a justice of the peace in local government, and (unusually) retained this office after the Restoration, until his death.

In 1654, he purchased the Jury Street House in Warwick as his town residence.

In 1694, it was the 0.5 metre thick stone walls of Jury Street House that prevented the Great Fire of Warwick, which destroyed the town's centre, from progressing down Jury Street to the half-timbered houses beyond. In the 18th century the town centre was rebuilt in Georgian style, and his descendants constructed the Georgian frontage that Jury Street House has retained to the present, originally with the family coat of arms at the apex.

His main claim to fame was as an antiquary, starting work on the history of his native county in the 1630s. William Dugdale was initially his assistant, but when Archer became more involved in public affairs, Dugdale took over the lead, resulting in the publication in 1656 of Dugdale's Antiquities of Warwickshire, with an acknowledgement to Archer's work in the dedication.

Archer had a significant collection of manuscripts that survive in the Shakespeare Birthplace Trust, the Warwickshire Record Office, and the Bodleian Library.

He married Anne, daughter of Sir John Ferrers of Tamworth Castle. He was succeeded at Umberslade Hall by his second son, Thomas. His great-grandson, also named Thomas, was created Baron Archer in 1747.

Parliament of England
Vacant Parliament suspended since 1629	Member of Parliament for Tamworth; 1640; With: George Abbot	Succeeded by Ferdinando Stanhope; Henry Wilmot
