= Ferdinando Stanhope =

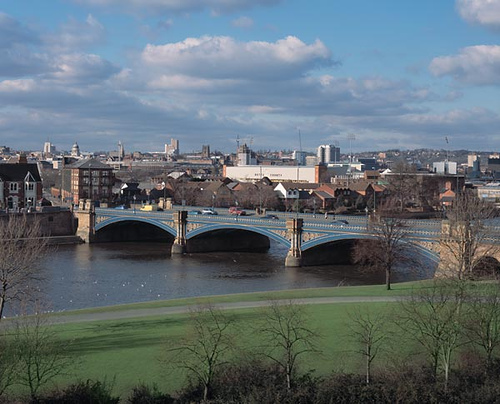
- Bridge over the River Trent seen from West Bridgford, where Stanhope was killed in December 1643

Member of Parliament for Tamworth
- In office 1640 – 1643 (excluded)

Personal details
- Born: 1619 Shelford Priory
- Died: 14 December 1643 (aged 24) West Bridgford
- Resting place: St Peter and St Paul churchyard
- Party: Royalist
- Spouse: Lettice Ferrers (1643-his death)
- Children: Anne
- Occupation: Politician and soldier

Military service
- Allegiance: England
- Rank: Colonel
- Battles/wars: First English Civil War; Edgehill; First Siege of Lichfield; Hopton Heath

Ferdinando Stanhope (1619 to December 1643), younger son of Philip Stanhope, 1st Earl of Chesterfield, was Member of Parliament for Tamworth from 1640 to 1643. He served in the Royalist army during the First English Civil War and was killed in a skirmish near West Bridgford.

== Personal details ==
Stanhope was born at Shelford Manor, Nottinghamshire; his date of birth is uncertain but must have been around 1618 in order to meet the minimum age of 21 when elected to Parliament in 1640. He was the ninth but fourth surviving son of Philip Stanhope, 1st Earl of Chesterfield and his wife Catherine, daughter of Francis Hastings, Lord Hastings.

Shortly before his death in 1643, he married Lettice Ferrers, daughter of Sir Humphrey Ferrers of Tamworth Castle, and left a posthumous daughter Anne.

== Career ==
In November 1640, Stanhope was elected Member of Parliament for Tamworth in the Long Parliament. When the First English Civil War began in August 1642, he joined the Royalist and fought in the Edgehill campaign. In early 1643, he was one of a group of officers created M.A. of the University of Oxford by Charles I.

Promoted colonel of a cavalry regiment which fought at Lichfield and Hopton Heath in April 1643, he was killed in December in a skirmish near West Bridgford. He was later buried in the family plot at St Peter and St Paul churchyard.

His cousin Sir Aston Cokain wrote him an epitaph:

:Here underneath this monumental Stone

Lie Honour, Youth, and Beauty all in One:
For Ferdinando Stanhope here doth rest,
Of all those Three the most unequal'd Test.
He was too handsome and too stout to be
Met face to face by any Enemy;
Therefore his foe (full for his death inclin'd)
Stole basely near, and shot him through behind.

— Aston Cokain.

== Ancestry ==
Ancestors of Ferdinando Stanhope

16. Sir Michael Stanhope
8. Sir Thomas Stanhope
17. Ann Rawson
4. Sir John Stanhope
18&26. John Port (the younger)
9. Margaret Port
19&27. Elizabeth Giffard
2. Philip Stanhope, 1st Earl of Chesterfield
20. Giles Allington
10. Richard Allington
21. Alice Middleton
5. Cordell Allington
22. John Cordell
11. Joan Cordell
23. Emma Webb
1. Ferdinando Stanhope
24. Francis Hastings, 2nd Earl of Huntingdon
12. George Hastings, 4th Earl of Huntingdon
25. Catherine Pole
6. Francis Hastings, Baron Hastings
26&18. John Port (the younger)
13. Dorothy Port
27&19. Elizabeth Giffard
3. Katherine Hastings
28. John Harrington
14. James Harrington
29. Elizabeth Moton
7. Sarah Harrington
30. William Sydney
15. Lucy Sidney
31. Anne Pakenham

== Sources ==
- BCW. "Duke of Gloucester's Regiment of Horse". BCW Project.
- Brydges, Sir Egerton, ed. (1812). Collin's Peerage of England, Volume III. Rivington and others. pp. 421–423.
- Cokain, Aston (1972) [1658]. The Dramatic Works of Sir Aston Cokain. Ayer Publishing. pp. 3, 4. ISBN 0-405-08365-3.
- Thoroton, Robert (1797). History of Nottinghamshire. Vol. 1 (reprint ed.). J. Throsby. p. 292.

Parliament of England
Preceded by Sir Simon Archer; George Abbot	Member of Parliament for Tamworth; 1640–1643; With: Henry Wilmot	Succeeded by George Abbot; Sir Peter Wentworth
