= William Bromley (died 1737) =

British politician

William Bromley (1699?–1737), of Baginton, Warwickshire, was a British Tory politician who sat in the House of Commons between 1725 and 1737.

== Early life ==
Bromley was second, but only surviving, son of William Bromley, Speaker of the House of Commons and his last wife Elizabeth Stawell, daughter of Ralph Stawell, 1st Baron Stawell.

He was educated at Westminster School in 1714, and matriculated at Christ Church, Oxford on 27 February 1717, at the age of 15. From 1721 to 1724 he undertook as Grand Tour through Italy and France.

== Career ==
Bromley entered Parliament unopposed as Member of Parliament for Fowey at a by-election on 15 March 1725 pending a general election. At the 1727 British general election he was returned unopposed as MP for Warwick. He was put forward by the party opposed to Robert Walpole to move the repeal of the Septennial Act on 13 March 1734. At the 1734 British general election he was re-elected for Warwick, but was unseated on petition. At a by-election on 2 February 1737, after the death of George Clarke, he was elected to represent Oxford University, which his father had represented for 30 years.

He died suddenly five weeks later, on 12 March 1737. His portrait is in the Bodleian Gallery.

== Family ==
Bromley married Lucy Throckmorton, daughter of Clement Throckmorton of Haseley, Warwickshire on 2 July 1724. They had two sons and a daughter, including his heir William Throckmorton Bromley MP.

Parliament of Great Britain
Preceded by John Goodall; Nicholas Vincent	Member of Parliament for Fowey; 1725–1727; With: Nicholas Vincent 1725–1727; The Viscount Fitzwilliam 1727	Succeeded by Jonathan Rashleigh; The Viscount FitzWilliam
Preceded by Dodington Greville; Sir William Keyt, Bt	Member of Parliament for Warwick; 1727–1735; With: Sir William Keyt, Bt	Succeeded by Thomas Archer; Henry Archer
Preceded by George Clarke; Viscount Cornbury	Member of Parliament for Oxford University; 1737; With: Viscount Cornbury	Succeeded by Viscount Cornbury; Edward Butler
