= John L'Archers =

14th-century English cleric and judge

John L'Archers, Larger or L'Archer (died 1349) was an English-born cleric and judge who had a distinguished career in Ireland, holding the offices of Lord Chancellor of Ireland and Deputy Justiciar. He died during the first outbreak of the Black Death in Europe and was probably a victim of it.

== Family ==
The Archer family, who later held the title Baron Archer, came from Tanworth in Arden in Warwickshire. They had owned Umberslade Hall outside Tamworth from the time of Henry II, and remained there for 600 years. John was probably the younger brother of Thomas L'Archer (died 1372); he was the great-nephew of an earlier Thomas L'Archer who was English Prior of the Order of Hospitallers from 1321 to 1329. This family tradition may have influenced John to join the Hospitallers; he is first recorded as a brother of the Order's Nottingham house in 1334.

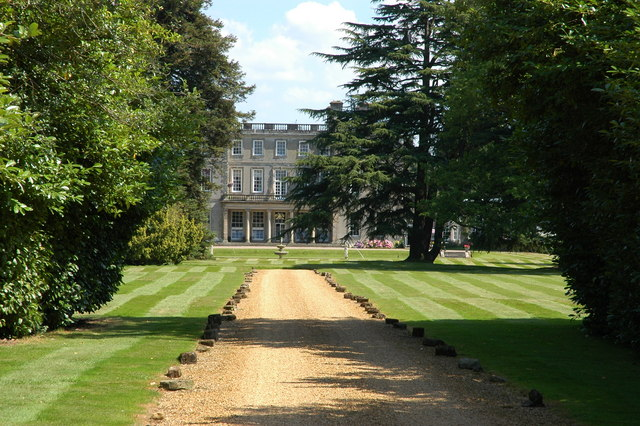
Umberslade Hall, near Tamworth, ancestral home of the Archer family from the twelfth century, present day

== Career ==
On the death of Roger Utlagh in 1341 L'Archer was appointed Prior of the Order's Irish house at Kilmainham. He was Deputy Justiciar of Ireland in 1346. As so often in this period, the exact dates of his term as Lord Chancellor are uncertain, but the most likely dates are 1342–1344. He was a member of the Privy Council of Ireland, and we have a record of his attendance at a Council meeting in 1346. He acted as a judge of assize in several counties in Leinster and Munster. He was evidently chosen as Chancellor because he was neutral between King Edward III and the Anglo-Irish nobility, whose relations then were bad, due largely to the ill-judged and quickly abandoned reform programme of 1341/2, which would have seen all royal grants of land since 1307 revoked.

O'Flanagan writing in 1870, said that L'Archer was one of several medieval Chancellors of Ireland who left no trace except their names on the pages of history.

On the other hand, Otway-Ruthven has recently described L'Archer as a leading statesman who played an important part in the political events of the early 1340s. The Irish Parliament, which met in Dublin in 1341 and then adjourned to Kilkenny, denounced the Anglo-Irish government of Ireland in terms of extraordinary severity for its misgovernment, and then produced a series of petitions to King Edward III, which were to be presented by a group of leading magnates and Crown officials. These petitions were a comprehensive denunciation of every aspect of government, including charges of corruption, maladministration and military incompetence. The King gave a favourable reception to the petitioners and promised redress for the wrongs complained of. L'Archer was one of the delegation: Otway-Ruthven believes that the fact that the newly appointed Lord Chancellor of Ireland went in person to present the petition was one of the reasons for the good reception it received.

It seems that the King formed a high opinion of L'Archer: in 1346 he was summoned abroad "at the King's command", and was given letters of protection for the journey. The nature of the royal business which gave rise to the journey is not specified. The King also regranted him some confiscated lands which had formerly belonged to the Order.

Archdall also gives some details of his career: in 1341 he sued the Archbishop of Dublin for possession of a church at "Dunbyn" (possibly Dunboyne). The litigation was settled after both parties had proposed to resolve the matter through trial by combat.

In an interesting entry, the Patent Roll states that L'Archer, on his appointment as Deputy Justiciar in August 1346, received a royal pardon under the Great Seal of Ireland at Cashel for all crimes or misdemeanours whatsoever committed to that date. As far as we can determine this refers to any crimes allegedly committed by or in the name of the Justiciar, rather than to L'Archer personally. An exception to the pardon was made for the murder of William de Burgh, 3rd Earl of Ulster in 1333. Most of those involved in the Earl's murder had already been punished, and who precisely was the target of this exclusion from the pardon is unclear; it may have become a standard formula.

== Death ==
The Black Death reached Ireland shortly after its first appearance in England in 1348. The death toll among senior officials in Ireland was not particularly high, but L'Archer, who died suddenly in 1349, was probably a plague victim.
