= Henry Archer (MP) =

British politician (1700–1768)

Member of Parliament for Warwick
- In office 1735–1768 Serving with Thomas Archer, Wills Hill, John Spencer, Hamilton Boyle, Paul Methuen, Lord George Greville
- Preceded by: Sir William Keyt, Bt; William Bromley
- Succeeded by: Lord George Greville; Paul Methuen

Personal details
- Born: 1700
- Died: 16 March 1768 (aged 67–68)
- Spouse: Lady Elizabeth Montagu (m. 1743)
- Relations: Thomas Archer, 1st Baron Archer (brother); Samuel Dashwood (grandfather)
- Parent(s): Andrew Archer; Elizabeth Dashwood
- Education: Eton College
- Alma mater: Trinity College, Oxford

Henry Archer (bp 18 November 1700 – 16 March 1768) of Hale, Hampshire was a British Member of Parliament.

== Early life ==
He was the second son of Andrew Archer of Umberslade Hall in Tanworth in Arden, Warwickshire and his wife Elizabeth Dashwood (a daughter of Sir Samuel Dashwood, Lord Mayor of London in 1702). His elder brother was Thomas Archer.

Henry was educated at Eton College and Trinity College, Oxford before proceeding to study law at the Middle Temple and the Inner Temple, where he was called to the bar in 1726.

== Career ==
A practising lawyer, he became a trustee in 1734, together with his elder brother, for the newly formed colony of Georgia on the east coast of America.

He served as Member of Parliament for Warwick from 1735 until his death in 1768. After Sir Robert Walpole's fall he was included in "the list of ministerial supporters but was absent from the division on the Hanoverians in December 1742, voting against them in 1744. In December 1744 he moved unsuccessfully to double the tax on places and pensions to ease the landed interest. He voted for the Hanoverians in 1746, when he was classed as Old Whig. In 1747 he was classed as a government supporter."

== Personal life ==
On 22 December 1743, Archer married Lady Elizabeth Montagu (d. 1789), a daughter of George Montagu, 1st Earl of Halifax and Lady Mary Lumley (a daughter of Richard Lumley, 1st Earl of Scarborough).

Archer died on 16 March 1768, aged 67.

== See also ==
- Trustees for the Establishment of the Colony of Georgia in America

Parliament of Great Britain
Preceded by Sir William Keyt, Bt; William Bromley	Member of Parliament for Warwick; 1735–1768; With: Thomas Archer (1735–41); Wills Hill (1741–56); John Spencer (1756–61); Hamilton Boyle (1761–62); Paul Methuen (1762–68); Lord George Greville (1768)	Succeeded by Lord George Greville; Paul Methuen
