= Joseph Clay Habersham =

American physician (1790–1855)

- Born: November 8, 1790; Savannah, Georgia, U.S.
- Died: November 2, 1855 (aged 64); Chatham County, Georgia, U.S.
- Resting place: Laurel Grove Cemetery, Savannah, Georgia, U.S.
- Occupation: Physician
- Father: John Habersham

Joseph Clay Habersham (November 8, 1790 – November 2, 1855) was an American physician. He was also a geologist and served as a president of Georgia Historical Society.

== Life and career ==
Habersham was born in Savannah, Georgia, in 1790 to John Habersham and Ann Sarah Camber. He was the eldest of their four known children, the others being John, Mary and Susan. The family grew up in White Bluff, Georgia.

He attended Princeton College and, after graduating, studied medicine in 1810 in Savannah. Two years later, he was a surgeon with U.S. Army in the War of 1812. After the war, he returned to practising medicine in Savannah. He also became president of the Medical Society of Georgia.

In 1815, he married Ann Wylly Adams, with whom he had six known children: Mary, Josephine, William, Anna, Joseph Jr. and Frances. (Josephine kept a diary, titled Ebb Tide, which was published by the University of Georgia Press in 1958.) The family lived on Liberty Street in Savannah.

Habersham was named president of Georgia Historical Society in the first half of the 19th century.

A geologist, Habersham, with the help of a fisherman, discovered the remains of a mastodon near Savannah. A French lieutenant, who was the guest of Habersham, asked if they could take the bones to Paris to be examined. In return, the guest would see that Habersham be made a Fellow of the Royal Academy. Habersham agreed, and the man sailed to France, never to be heard from again. Habersham also wrote a chapter in William B. Hodgson's Memoir of a Megatherium (1846).

He played the violin.

== Death ==
Habersham died, of inflammation of the lungs, in 1855, aged 64. He was interred in Savannah's Laurel Grove Cemetery. His inscription, taken from 2 Corinthians, chapter 5, verse 21, reads: "He hath made him to be the sin for us, who know no sin, that we might be made the righteous of God in him." His widow was buried beside him upon her death in 1876, aged 81.
