= Joseph Clay Habersham Jr. =

American physician (1829–1881)

- Born: October 9, 1829; Savannah, Georgia, U.S.
- Died: January 17, 1881 (aged 51); Savannah, Georgia, U.S.
- Resting place: Laurel Grove Cemetery, Savannah, Georgia, U.S.
- Occupation: Physician
- Father: Joseph Clay Habersham

Joseph Clay Habersham Jr. (October 9, 1829 – January 17, 1881) was an American medical doctor. After serving in the American Civil War, he became president of the Georgia Medical Association.

== Life and career ==
Habersham was born in Savannah, Georgia, in 1829 to Dr. Joseph Clay Habersham and Ann Wylly Adams. He was the fifth of their six known children. He graduated from the medical school of Harvard University in May 1853.

In 1857, Habersham married Mary Ann Stiles. By 1860, Habersham was practising medicine in Savannah with his brother-in-law Clifford A. Stiles.

During the American Civil War, Habersham was appointed assistant surgeon of the Provisional Army of the Confederate States in July 1861, and reported to General Alexander Robert Lawton. Two months later, Habersham had been promoted to surgeon. In August 1863, he submitted a leave of absence, having been afflicted by several fevers. It was supported by John Frederick Meckel Geddings, fellow surgeon, who deemed Habersham would be unable to resume his duties for at least fifteen days. The leave was granted by General P. G. T. Beauregard. Later that month, it was discovered that Habersham had been exposed to malaria and would be in no position to resume his duties until his strength improved. His leave was extended, as it was the following month. He returned to duty in November, relieving Surgeon Charles R. Thomson in Columbia, South Carolina.

Habersham asked for an extension of furlough in December, and was relieved of his duties in the new year of 1864 and reassigned to being post surgeon in Savannah, a role he began in February. He was promoted to surgeon in May. Later that month, he became senior surgeon for the Medical Board of Examiners in the District of Georgia.

Five years after the cessation of the Civil War, Habersham was again practising medicine in Savannah. He and his family were living at 12 Habersham Street, near its intersection with Bay Street, which was one of the homes demolished in the mid-20th century.

In 1876, Habersham was elected president of the Georgia Medical Association, having served as its vice-president for the preceding decade.

== Death ==
Habersham died in 1881, aged 51. He was interred in Savannah's Laurel Grove Cemetery. His widow was buried beside him upon her death in 1920, aged 87.
