= Baron Archer =

Barony in the Peerage of Great Britain

Baron Archer, of Umberslade in the County of Warwick, was a title in the Peerage of Great Britain. It was created on 7 July 1747 for Thomas Archer, who had previously represented Warwick and Bramber in the House of Commons. He was succeeded by his son, the second Baron. He sat as Member of Parliament for Coventry. The title became extinct on his death in 1778. The first Baron was the son of Andrew Archer, the grandson of Thomas Archer, the great-grandson of Sir Simon Archer and the nephew of the architect Thomas Archer.

The family seat was Umberslade Hall, Warwickshire, where they are recorded as early as the reign of Henry I.

== Barons Archer (1747) ==
- Thomas Archer, 1st Baron Archer (1695–1768), son of Andrew Archer
- Andrew Archer, 2nd Baron Archer (1736–1778)

== Ancestors ==
- Thomas L'Archer (died 1329), appointed Prior of the Hospitaller Order of St. John of Jerusalem in 1321
- John L'Archers (died 1349), great-nephew of Thomas L'Archer, Lord Chancellor of Ireland
- Sir Simon Archer (1581–1662), antiquary and politician
- Thomas Archer (c. 1619–1685), son of Sir Simon Archer, Member of Parliament for Warwickshire in 1660
- Andrew Archer (1659–1741), eldest son of Thomas Archer, Member of Parliament for Warwickshire four times between 1690 and 1722
- Thomas Archer (1668–1743), youngest son of Thomas Archer, Baroque architect and courtier
