= Branco (surname) =

Branco is a Portuguese and Galician surname meaning 'White.' Notable people with the surname include:

- Benjamin Branco (born 1992), Danish musician
- Cassiano Branco (1897–1970), Portuguese architect
- Cristina Branco (born 1972), Portuguese fado singer
- Joaquim Rafael Branco (born 1953), São Toméan politician
- Jorge Branco de Sampaio (1939–2021), Portuguese lawyer, politician, and the former President of the Republic
- Juan Branco (born 1989), French-Spanish lawyer, political activist and writer
- Luís de Freitas Branco (1890–1955), Portuguese composer and an academic
- Marcelo Branco (born 1945), Brazilian bridge player
- Mário Branco (born 1975), Portuguese football manager
- Paulo Branco (born 1950), Portuguese film producer
- Serge Branco (born 1980), Cameroonian footballer
- Silvio Branco (born 1966), Italian boxer
