= Harry Chapman (news anchor) =

Harry Edwin Chapman was a news anchor at WTVF CBS (NewsChannel5) in Nashville, Tennessee for 35 years before retiring in 2006. He was a long time co-host of the midday CBS show "Talk of the Town" and hosted "Words and Music" on NewsChannel5+.

== Early life ==
Chapman grew up in Hartwell, Georgia and played football at Hart County High School until a broken arm ended his playing career. He started in broadcasting during high school at WKLY in Hartwell. He then enrolled at the University of Georgia where he earned his journalism degree from the Henry W. Grady College of Journalism. While an undergraduate in Athens, he worked for Georgia Public Television and was hired by H. Randolph Holder to work at WGAU and WNGC. As a student, he was also the voice of the Redcoat Band.

== Career ==
In the fall of 1967, Chapman was hired straight out of the University of Georgia at WSB (AM) and WSB-FM in Atlanta, Georgia. From 1967-1971, he worked both the night shift and the early afternoon shift for the station. During this time, he traveled back to Athens, Georgia on Saturdays in the fall where he was the PA announcer at Sanford Stadium for home football games.

In 1971, Chapman was hired by WTVF (NewsChannel5) in Nashville, Tennessee. He did everything from anchor the midday report to producing documentaries. He was the entertainment reporter covering the country music industry in Nashville. In 1974, he teamed with Oprah Winfrey to be Nashville's first male-female anchor team. He was the co-host of "Talk of the Town", the longest running locally produced talk show in the country. He still hosts "Words and Music" on (NewsChannel5+), where he conducts personal interviews with songwriters in Music City. Chapman is on staff at Belmont University as the Director of Development and Major Gifts. He is also a contributing author for Southern Exposure Magazine.

== Awards ==
- In 1998, the Georgia Legislature honored him with a resolution for his career accomplishments.
- He received the Country Music Awards Media Achievement Award in 2001.
- He received the John Holloman, Jr. Award for Lifetime Achievement from the Henry W. Grady College of Journalism in 2004.
