= Juanita Baranco =

American corporate executive

Juanita Baranco (born March 19, 1949) is an American corporate executive. She has been noted for breaking "race and gender barriers" in Georgia.

== Biography ==
Juanita Powell Baranco was born in Washington, D.C. Raised in Shreveport, Louisiana, Baranco earned her high school diploma and continued her studies earning her B.S. degree and her J.D. degree from Louisiana State University. Baranco practiced a successful career before becoming the assistant attorney general for the state of Georgia. She is the executive vice president and chief operating officer of Baranco Automotive Group, which she co-founded with her husband, Gregory Baranco in 1978. It was one of the first African American owned car dealerships in the metropolitan Atlanta area. In the 1980s, the recession almost destroyed their business, and barely made it through the economic recession. That effort led the Barancos to also owning several other car dealerships including Mercedes-Benz of Buckhead and several Acura dealerships. During her time at the dealership, she has had to fight gender-bias and sexism.

Baranco's extensive involvement in education has led her to serve as the chairman of the DeKalb County Education Task Force and as a member of the Georgia State Board of Education from 1985 to 1991. She was appointed by Governor Zell Miller to the Board of Regents and in 1995 became the first African American women to chair the board. She is the chair of the Board of Trustees of Clark Atlanta University and also serves on the Board of Directors of Georgia Power Company. As a chair of Georgia's Board of Regents, she opposed dismantling educational programs that included race and affirmative action. During her time on the board, she was considered a "no-nonsense leader" by Black Issues in Higher Education.

She was inducted into the Georgia State University Business Hall of Fame.

Her business and community activities have won her numerous awards, among which are recognition by the Dow Jones Company for entrepreneurial excellence; the first Trumpet Award from Turner Broadcasting System for entrepreneurial excellence; Entrepreneur of the Year by the Atlanta Business League; the DECCA Award from the Atlantic Business Chronicle, the YWCA's Women of Achievement Award; and the Atlanta History Center's Defining Women in Atlanta Award. Baranco has been featured in Essence magazine as one of the best businesswomen in Atlanta and was also a finalist for the 2003 Time magazine Quality Dealer Award. She is a member of the American Bar Association and the State Bar Associations of Georgia and Louisiana.

She is also a member of Delta Sigma Theta sorority.

In 2015, she was listed as one of Georgia's 100 Most Influential Women.

== Awards and honors ==
In 2021, Baranco was named a Georgia Trustee by the Georgia Historical Society, in conjunction with the Office of the Governor of Georgia, to recognize accomplishments and community service that reflect the ideals of the founding body of Trustees, which governed the Georgia colony from 1732 to 1752.
