= Sir William Keyt, 3rd Baronet =

Sir William Keyt
- 3rd Baronet Keyt of Ebrington
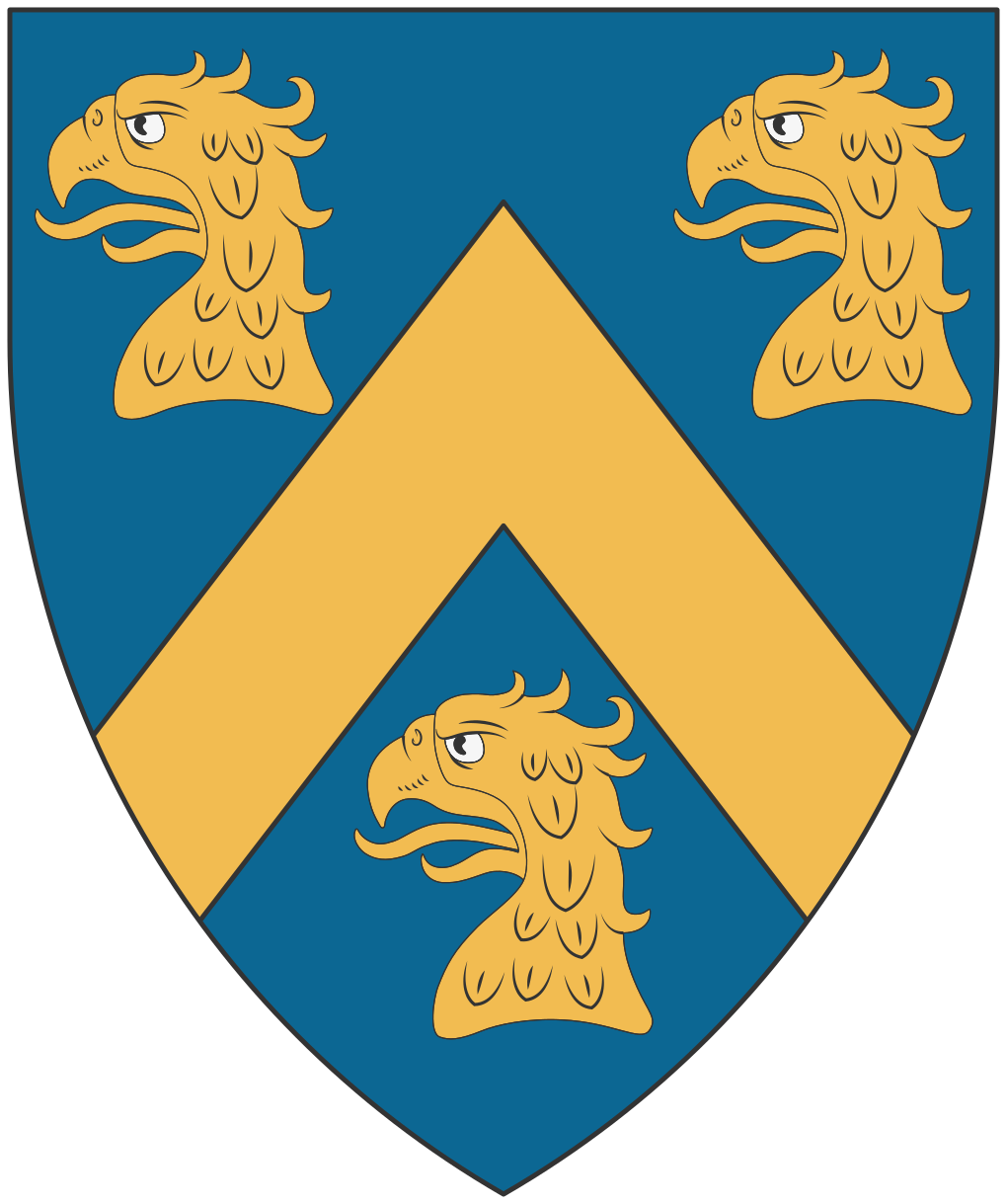
- Coat of arms
- Tenure: 1702–1741
- Predecessor: Sir William Keyt, 2nd Baronet
- Successor: Sir Thomas Charles Keyt, 4th Baronet
- Spouse: Anne Tracy (m. 1710)
- Issue: Thomas Charles Keyt, 4th Baronet; John Keyt; William Keyt; Robert Keyt; Agnes Keyt

Sir William Keyt, 3rd Baronet (8 July 1688 –1741) of Norton House, Gloucestershire, was a British landowner and politician who sat in the House of Commons from 1722 to 1735. He died at his house in a catastrophic fire of his own creation and the garden which remained, and was restored, gave rise to the poem Burnt Norton by T. S. Eliot.

== Early life ==
Keyt was the eldest son of William Keyt of Ebrington, Gloucestershire, and his wife Agnes Clopton, daughter of Sir John Clopton of Clopton, Warwickshire. He was educated privately. He succeeded his grandfather in the baronetcy on 30 November 1702. He married Anne Tracy, daughter of William Tracy, 4th Viscount Tracy, of Rathcoole on 23 November 1710.

== Career ==
Keyt became Recorder of Stratford-on-Avon in 1709 and held the post for the rest of his life. He was a leading Jacobite in Warwickshire and in 1715 he was taken off the commission of the peace because he proclaimed the Pretender. He was elected Tory Member of Parliament for Warwick at a by-election on 22 November 1722 which was at great expense to both sides. In Parliament, he consistently voted against the Government. A local Whig wrote of him that he was 'a Tory indeed; barring that I hear a mighty good character of him in all respects'. He was returned unopposed at the 1727 general election. At the 1734 general election, there was a contest at Warwick in which he was successful in the poll, but unseated on petition on 25 February 1735.

== Death and legacy ==
In 1716 Keyt acquired Norton House near Chipping Campden. He built a mansion on an adjacent site and laid out a garden at the same time. It had a large parterre, terraces and plantations with walks. He left his wife for her maid, and went to live at Norton with her. When she saw his house, she asked ‘what is a kite without wings’, and so he extended it with two large side extensions. In time she deserted him, and he began drinking heavily. One night in September 1741 he caused a fire which spread to the whole house. Unsuccessful attempts were made to rescue him and little was left of him to be buried at the church of Aston-sub-Edge. It was said he was deranged and set the fire deliberately. It was also proposed that he started the fire after a bout of heavy drinking.

Keyt left children

- Thomas Charles Keyt (1712-1755) who succeeded to the baronetcy as 4th Baronet
- John Keyt, an officer in the army
- William Keyt who died young
- Robert Keyt (1714-1784) who succeeded to the baronetcy as 5th Baronet and died without issue
- Agnes who married Edward Gibbes and had three daughters

The estate became known as Burnt Norton and the garden remained as an attraction. It was after visiting the garden that T. S. Eliot wrote Burnt Norton the first of his Four Quartets.

Keyt's story is the basis for the historical novel Burnt Norton by Caroline Sandon.

Parliament of Great Britain
Preceded by William Colemore; Dodington Greville	Member of Parliament for Warwick; 1722–1735; With: Dodington Greville 1722-1727; William Bromley 1727-1735	Succeeded by Thomas Archer; Henry Archer
Baronetage of England
Preceded by William Keyt	Baronet (of Ebrington); 1702–1741	Succeeded by Thomas Charles Keyt
