= Thomas Archer (divine) =

English divine

Thomas Archer (1554-1630?) was an English divine.

== Life ==
Archer was born in Bury St. Edmunds 12 August 1554, and educated at Trinity College, Cambridge, where he was elected to a fellowship. He took his master's degree in 1582, and in November 1584 became chaplain to his kinsman, Dr. John May, bishop of Carlisle. In 1588 he was public preacher to the university, and in May 1589 was inducted rector of Houghton Conquest and Houghton Gildable, in Bedfordshire. He served as chaplain in 1599 to Archbishop Whitgift, and in 1605 was made one of the king's chaplains in ordinary.

In 1623, he made a vault for himself in the chancel of Houghton Conquest Church, and five years later added his epitaph in English and Latin.

== Works ==
He kept an obituary of eminent persons who died in his time, and also wrote an account (extracts from which are preserved among the Baker MSS. at Cambridge) of the parish and neighbourhood of Houghton Conquest. His manuscripts were lent in 1760 by Dr. Zachary Grey, then rector of Houghton Conquest, to William Cole, the author of Athenæ Cantabrigienses. who describes the collection as one of much interest and value. Archer is supposed to have died about 1630, as the obituary notices do not go beyond that date. Cole mentions also a manuscript diary of Archer's, which contained anecdotes.
