= Ed Grisamore =

American journalist

Ed Grisamore is an American journalist who has been a local news columnist for The Telegraph in Macon, Georgia, since 1996. He was the recipient of the 2010 Will Rogers Humanitarian Award, presented by the National Society of Newspaper Columnists. Grisamore has written nine books, including collections of his columns, a history of the minor league hockey team Macon Whoopees and biographies of football coach Billy Henderson humorist and television personality Durwood "Mr. Doubletalk" Fincher and a history of Macon's Nu-Way Weiners, the second-oldest hot dog stand in America.

== Journalism career ==
Grisamore is a native of Atlanta, Georgia, and a graduate of the University of Georgia with a degree in journalism. Before becoming a news columnist, he was an editor, reporter and columnist for The Telegraph's sports department and was inducted into the Macon Sports Hall of Fame in 2008.

Grisamore began writing local news columns in 1996. In June 1998, he succeeded Bill Boyd as the paper's featured local news columnist. His columns chronicle the accomplishments and struggles of people living in and around Macon.

The announcement of the 2010 Will Rogers Humanitarian Award cited Grisamore's "widely varied record of community service," including his contributions to Macon's annual International Cherry Blossom Festival and his fundraising efforts for local charities.

In June 2012, Grisamore was named Georgia Author of the Year in the Essays category by the Georgia Writers Association.

In May 2015, Grisamore retired from The Telegraph after a 36-year newspaper career. He taught journalism at Stratford Academy in Macon for nine years. He is now the local/state columnist for The Macon Melody newspaper.

Grisamore received the in April 2024 and was named a fellow at the Grady College of Journalism and Mass Communication at the University of Georgia.

== Bibliography ==
- The Pinkest Party on Earth: The Story of Macon's International Cherry Blossom Festival
- There's More Than One Way to Spell Wiener: The Story of Nu-Way
- Never Put a Ten-Dollar Tree in a Ten-Cent Hole" and other stories
- Once Upon a Whoopee (with Bill Buckley)
- It Can Be Done: The Billy Henderson Story
- Once You Step in Elephant Manure You’re in the Circus Forever: The Life and Sometimes of Durwood “Mr. Doubletalk” Fincher
- Smack Dab in Dog Crossing
- Gris & That
- True Gris
- More Gris
