= Robert S. Jepson Jr. =

Robert Scott Jepson Jr. (born 1942) is a Georgia-based philanthropist and businessman. He founded the Jepson School of Leadership Studies at University of Richmond, and is the current chair of the Georgia Ports Authority.

Jepson attended the University of Richmond, where he was selected for membership in Omicron Delta Kappa in 1963. In 2008 he was honored with the Laurel Crowned Circle Award, the society's highest honor.

He is the chair and chief executive officer of Jepson Associates Inc., a private-equity firm (SBIC) and was the founding chair and CEO of The Jepson Corporation (sold to Great American Management and Investment Inc. in 1989).

Jepson served as chairman of the Board of Curators for the Georgia Historical Society from 2014–2016. In 2015, the Georgia Historical Society's Jepson House Education Center was founded, named in honor of Robert and his wife Alice, who made the project possible. The Jepson House serves as the Georgia Historical Society's hub for history-based education around the state.

He is a former trustee of the University of Richmond and one of its largest financial supporters.

Jepson has been named a Georgia Trustee by the Georgia Historical Society and was inducted by governor of Georgia Brian Kemp on February 15, 2020, at the Trustees Gala in Savannah. The honor is given by the Georgia Historical Society, in conjunction with the governor of Georgia, to individuals whose accomplishments and community service reflect the ideals of the founding body of Trustees, which governed the Georgia colony from 1732 to 1752.

He is married to Alice Andrews Jepson.
