= Steve Oney =

American journalist and author

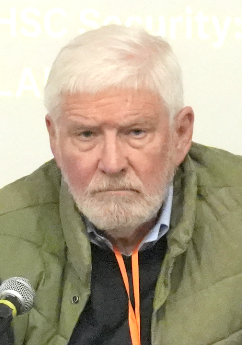
Steve Oney at the 2025 Los Angeles Times Festival of Books

Steve Oney is an American journalist and author. He is a former staff writer for The Atlanta Journal-Constitution magazine and Los Angeles magazine.

== Books ==
- And the Dead Shall Rise: The Murder of Mary Phagan and the Lynching of Leo Frank
- A Man's World: A Gallery of Fighters, Creators, Actors, and Desperadoes
- On Air: The Triumph and Tumult of NPR (2025)

== Recognition ==
In 2024, Steve Oney was named a Vincent J. Dooley Distinguished Teaching Fellow by the Georgia Historical Society. Dooley Distinguished Teaching Fellows are national leaders in the field of history whose research has significantly shaped public understanding of the past.
