= Thomas L'Archer =

English monk

Thomas L'Archer (died 1329) was an English monk who held the office of English Prior of the Order of St. John of Jerusalem. His financial incompetence left the Order in severe difficulty.

He was born at Tanworth in Arden in Warwickshire, a younger son of John L'Archer and Margery Barniville. The Archer family owned Umberslade Hall from the time of Henry II until the nineteenth century. Two of his brothers also entered the Church. John L'Archers, prior of the Order's Irish house in the 1340s, was his great-nephew.

In 1321, Thomas became Prior of the Order's English House. He proved to be a most unfortunate choice. Although he worked diligently in his early years as Prior to extend the Order's property holdings, in his last years, through a combination of old age and financial misjudgment, he appears to have bankrupted the English House. The Grand Master of the Order of St. John set up an inquiry into the financial state of the English House, which recommended Thomas's removal on grounds of old age. He died soon afterwards, on 28 August 1329.

Under his term as Prior, the Hospitallers acquired 33 ex-Templar possessions, more than under any of his predecessors or successors. He secured passage of an Act of Parliament in 1324 for this purpose. Passage of the statute required the paying of numerous bribes, which may partly explain the Order's later financial crisis. The Order's possession of the most valuable of the properties, the Inner Temple, was short-lived, as L'Archer almost immediately surrendered it to Hugh le Despenser, the prime royal favourite of King Edward II, no doubt at the King's request.
