= Peter Wentworth (Roundhead) =

Sir Peter Wentworth (1592 – 1 December 1675) was a grandson of Peter Wentworth, being the son of Peter's eldest son Nicholas, from whom he inherited the manor of Lillingstone Lovell. He was a leading Parliamentarian during the Commonwealth.

As sheriff of Oxfordshire in 1634 he was charged with the duty of collecting the levy of ship money, in which he encountered popular opposition. He was MP for Tamworth in the Long Parliament, but refused to act as a commissioner for the trial of Charles I. He was a member of the Council of State during the Commonwealth, but was denounced for immorality by Oliver Cromwell in April 1653, and his speech in reply was interrupted by Cromwell's forcible expulsion of the Rump Parliament. On the overthrow of Richard Cromwell, Wentworth returned to his place in the Long Parliament, and on 10 January 1660 lodgings were assigned to him in Whitehall by the Council of State.

Sir Peter, who was a friend of John Milton, died on the 1st of December 1675, having never been married. By his will he left a legacy to Milton, and considerable estates to his grand-nephew Fisher Dilke, who took the name of Wentworth. This name was borne by his descendants until dropped in the 18th century.
