= Keyt baronets =

Extinct baronetcy of England

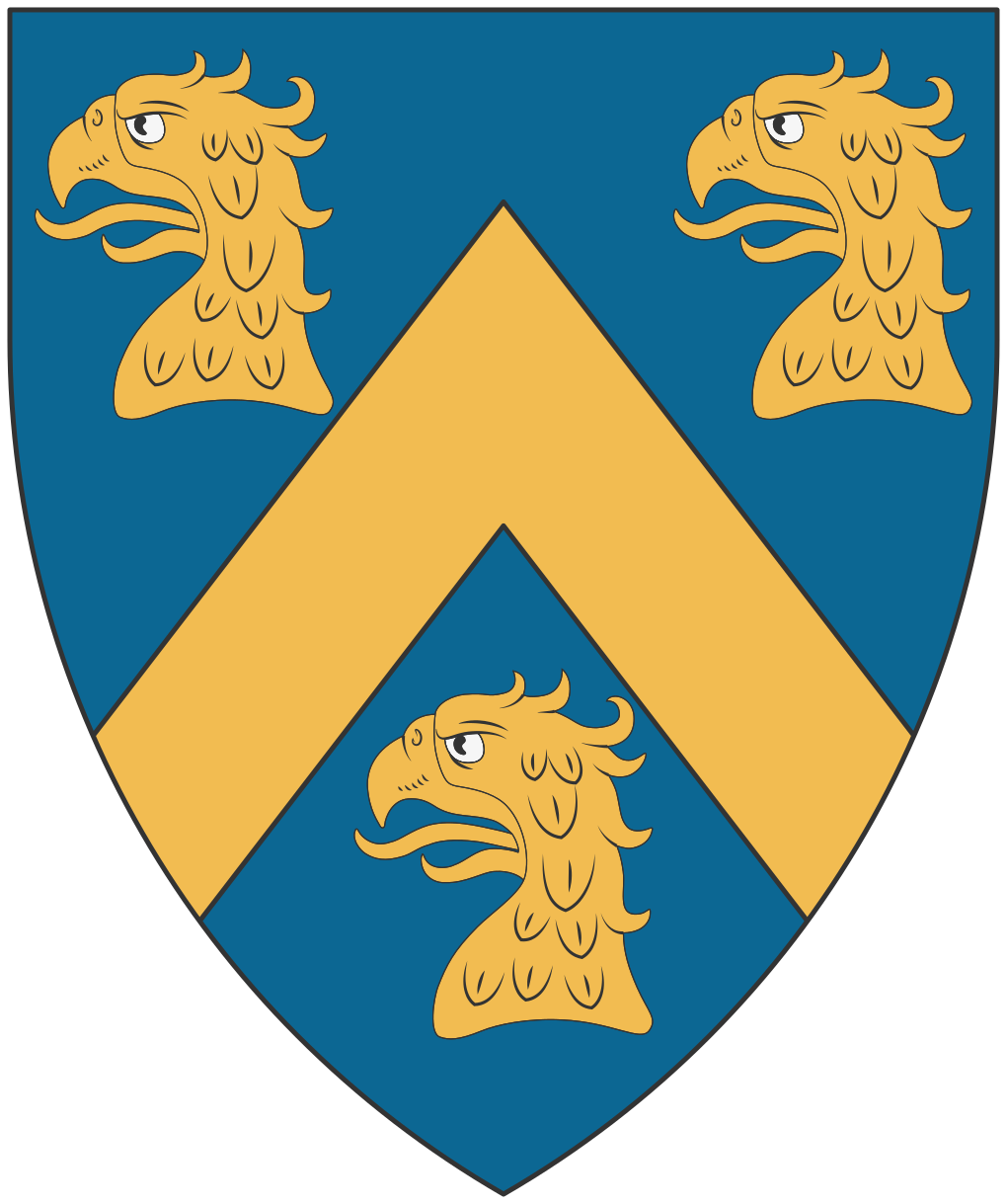
Arms of Keyt of Ebrington

The Keyt Baronetcy, of Ebrington in the County of Gloucester, was a title in the Baronetage of England. It was created on 22 December 1660 by King Charles II for John Keyt, who had raised a troop of horse to fight in the Royalist cause. Although the son of the 2nd Baronet had actually died a few days before his father, the baronetcy was allowed by royal command to pass to his eldest child, who became the 3rd Baronet and member of parliament for Warwick. The title became extinct on the death of the fifth Baronet in 1784.

== Keyt baronets, of Ebrington (1660) ==
- Sir John Keyt, 1st Baronet (1616–1662)
- Sir William Keyt, 2nd Baronet (1638–1702)
  - William Keyt (1668–1702)
- Sir William Keyt, 3rd Baronet (1688–1741)
- Sir Thomas Charles Keyt, 4th Baronet (1713–1755)
- Sir Robert Keyt, 5th Baronet (1724–1784)
