= Thomas Archer, 1st Baron Archer =

English politician (1695–1768)

Thomas Archer, 1st Baron Archer (21 July 1695 – 19 October 1768) was an English Member of Parliament, who was created Baron Archer in 1747. His arms are blazoned: Azure three arrows or.

== Biography ==
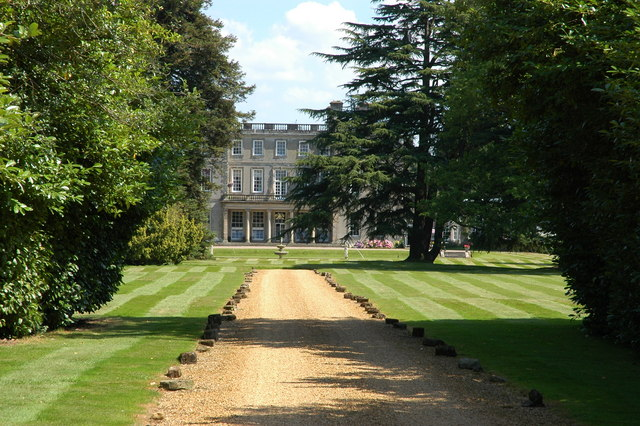
Umberslade Hall

He was the eldest son and heir of Andrew Archer of Umberslade Hall in Tanworth in Arden, Warwickshire and his wife Elizabeth Dashwood. His younger brother was Henry Archer. Thomas succeeded his father to Umberslade in 1741.

He served as Member of Parliament of Warwick from 1735 to 1741 and then for the rotten borough of Bramber in Sussex from 1741 until 1747, when he was raised to the peerage. He was also Custos Rotulorum of Flintshire from 1750 to 1753.

In 1734 he became a trustee, together with his younger brother, for the newly formed colony of Georgia on the east coast of America.

He married Catherine Tipping, daughter of Sir Thomas Tipping, 1st Baronet and Anne Cheke, and had a son and daughters. He was succeeded by his son Andrew Archer, 2nd Baron Archer, on whose death in 1778 the title became extinct. His daughter Catherine married Other Windsor, 4th Earl of Plymouth. His daughter Anne married Edward Garth-Turnour, 1st Earl Winterton.

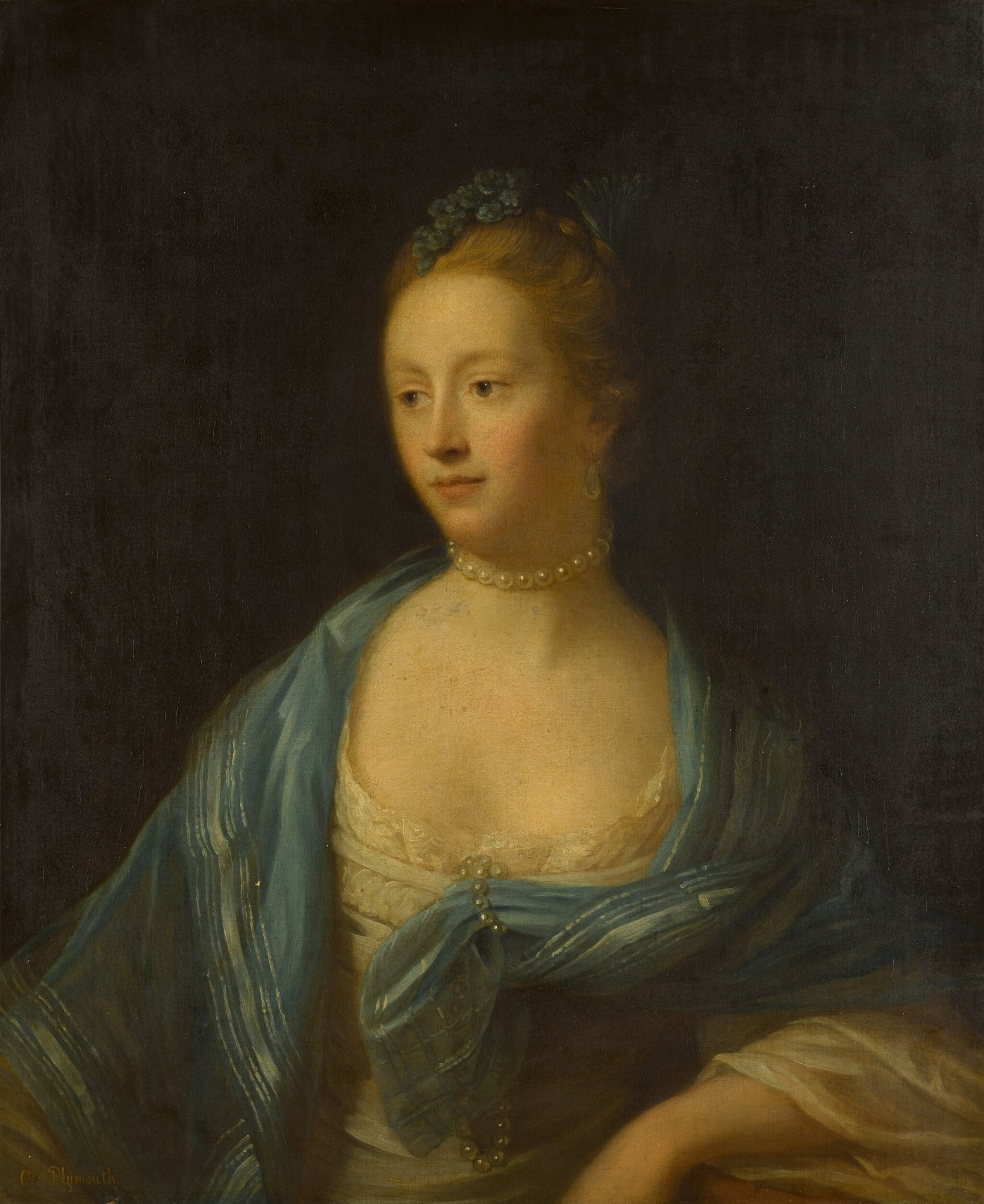
Portrait of the Hon. Catherine Windsor (née Archer), Countess of Plymouth

== See also ==
- Trustees for the Establishment of the Colony of Georgia in America
- Umberslade Obelisk

== Ancestry ==
Ancestors of Thomas Archer, 1st Baron Archer

Andrew Archer of Umberslade
Sir Simon Archer of Umberslade
Margaret Raleigh or Rawley
Colonel Thomas Archer of Umberslade
Sir John Ferrers of Tamworth
Anne Ferrers
Dorothy Puckering
Andrew Archer of Umberslade
Richard Leigh of London
Anne Leigh
Thomas Archer, 1st Baron Archer
Samuel Dashwood of Rowdon
Francis Dashwood of Vellow Wood
Elizabeth Sweeting
Sir Samuel Dashwood
Alice Sleigh
Elizabeth Dashwood
John Smith of Tedworth
Anne Smith

Parliament of Great Britain
| Preceded by Sir William Keyt; William Bromley | Member of Parliament for Warwick; 1735–1741; With: Henry Archer | Succeeded by Henry Archer; Wills Hill |
| Preceded by Sir Harry Gough; Harry Gough | Member of Parliament for Bramber; 1741–1747; With: Harry Gough | Succeeded by Harry Gough; Joseph Damer |
Honorary titles
| Vacant Title last held by Sir Roger Mostyn | Custos Rotulorum of Flintshire; 1750–1753 | Succeeded by The Earl of Plymouth |
Peerage of Great Britain
| New creation | Baron Archer; 1747–1768 | Succeeded by Andrew Archer |
