= Poetter Hall =

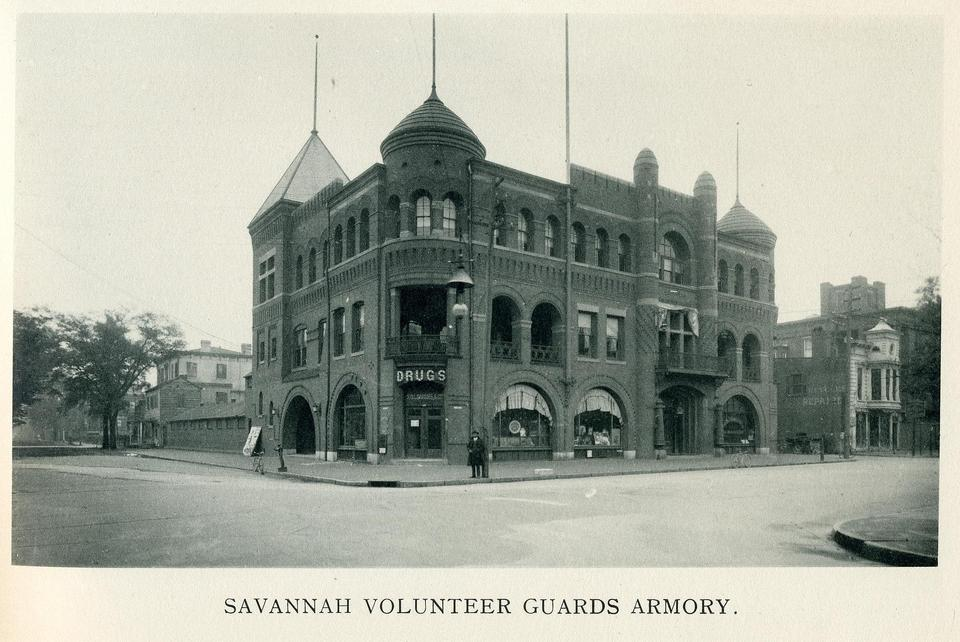
- The building in 1902

- Location within Georgia Location within the United States
- Former names: Savannah Volunteer Guards Armory; Preston Hall

General information
- Architectural style: Richardsonian Romanesque
- Location: 342 Bull Street; Madison Square; Savannah, Georgia, United States
- Coordinates: 32°4′23″N 81°5′38″W
- Construction started: 1892; 134 years ago
- Completed: 1893; 133 years ago
- Owner: Savannah College of Art and Design

Technical details
- Floor count: 3

Design and construction
- Architect: William G. Preston

Poetter Hall is an academic building in Savannah, Georgia, United States. Designed by William G. Preston and completed in 1893, the building originally served as a National Guard Armory and was called the Savannah Volunteer Guards Armory. In 1979, the building underwent an extensive renovation and became the first academic building for the Savannah College of Art and Design.

== History ==
In April 1889, a fire destroyed a National Guard Armory in Savannah, Georgia, which had been designed by architect J. A. Wood in 1885. In 1890, the Savannah Volunteer Guards (a part of the United States National Guard) purchased a new property at the intersection of Bull Street and Madison Street and, while initially planning to simply expand the pre-existing building at the site, decided instead to demolish the building and build a new armory at the site. William G. Preston was hired to design the new building, having established himself as an architect in the city since designing the Chatham County courthouse in 1889. Preston would go on to design several Romanesque Revival buildings in the city, and the design for the armory, called the Savannah Volunteer Guards Armory, was in the Richardsonian Romanesque style. The location for the new armory was across the street from the Hotel DeSoto, which Preston had designed several years earlier in 1890. Construction began in February 1892, and by 1893 the building was completed. The building would house the National Guard unit, and later a high school, until World War II, when the United Service Organizations became the building's main tenants.

In March 1979, the building was acquired by the newly-created Savannah College of Art and Design (SCAD) to serve as their first academic building. At the time, the building was in a deteriorated state, and a large-scale renovation commenced. The building, rechristened Preston Hall after its architect, opened in September 1979, and the following year, SCAD received an award from the Historic Savannah Foundation for their preservation efforts with the building. The building was later renamed to its current name in honor of May and Paul Poetter, two cofounders of SCAD and parents of fellow SCAD cofounder Paula Wallace.

== Bibliography ==
- Craig, Robert M. (September 30, 2006). "Late Victorian Architecture: Overview". New Georgia Encyclopedia. Archived from the original on November 2, 2020.
- Morekis, Jim (2018). Moon Savannah: With Hilton Head. Avalon Publishing. ISBN 978-1-64049-301-8 – via Google Books.
- Pinkerton, Connie Capozzola; Burke, Maureen (2004). The Savannah College of Art and Design: Restoration of an Architectural Heritage. Arcadia Publishing. ISBN 978-0-7385-1718-6 – via Google Books.
- Rhone, Nedra (January 28, 2019). "SCAD turns 40: A flashback in photos". The Atlanta Journal-Constitution. Cox Enterprises. Archived from the original on October 31, 2020.
- "Poetter Hall, SCAD". Society of Architectural Historians. Archived from the original on October 31, 2020.
- Toledano, Roulhac (1997). The National Trust Guide to Savannah. John Wiley & Sons. ISBN 978-0-471-15568-3 – via Google Books.
