= Paula Wallace =

American academic

Paula Wallace is president and co-founder of the Savannah College of Art and Design (SCAD). She was awarded the Presidential Citizens Medal at The White House on January 2, 2025.

== Early life and education ==
A native of Atlanta, Wallace earned a B.A. degree from Furman University, M.Ed. and Ed.S. degrees from Georgia State University and an honorary Doctor of Law from Gonzaga University. She began her career as an elementary school teacher in Atlanta Public Schools. After realizing there was nowhere for her students to continue their artistic pursuit, Wallace and her family sold their belongings to buy Poetter Hall in Savannah, Georgia. She would use Poetter Hall to start the Savannah College of Art and Design (SCAD), which has grown substantially since, now totaling over 10,000 students yearly. Wallace has been the president of SCAD since 2000.

== Career ==
In 1978, she co-founded the Savannah College of Art and Design (SCAD) in Savannah, Georgia Between the university's founding with her then-husband Richard Rowan and 2000, she served in various roles as vice president, academic dean, and provost of SCAD. In 2000, she was appointed to the office of president of the university by the SCAD Board of Trustees, and continues to serve in that role. She also directs the university's permanent art collection at the SCAD Museum of Art in Savannah and SCAD FASH Museum of Fashion + Film in Atlanta.

Since Wallace became president of SCAD, the university has added campus locations in Atlanta, Georgia (in 2005), Lacoste, France (in 2002) and Hong Kong (in 2010), and an eLearning program online (in 2003). Enrollment at SCAD has more than doubled during her tenure, with more than 12,000 students from more than 100 countries attending the university's campuses.

In March 2020, following months of pressure during the 2019 Hong Kong Protests and the COVID-19 pandemic, SCAD elected to discontinue studies at their Hong Kong location, citing student safety and academic quality. The North Kowloon Magistracy will be returned to the city.

The university hosts a number of annual events created by Wallace, including the Sidewalk Arts Festival, the Savannah Film Festival, SCAD define ART, Scad style, and SCAD ATV Fest. During her presidency, the university has received recognition for its work in historic preservation, including awards from the Georgia Trust for Historic Preservation, UNESCO, the International Interior Design Association and the American Library Association, and the American Institute of Architects, among others. SCAD has placed highly in various rankings under Wallace's leadership, including a place in the top four universities in the Americas and Europe in 2015 by Red Dot, as well as first-place rankings for the graduate and undergraduate interior design programs in Design Intelligence's "America's Best Architecture and Design Schools" list. Wallace and SCAD have also come under scrutiny for allegedly unscrupulous financial practices, notably in an Atlanta Journal-Constitution article, "How SCAD sells a dream", as well as in a slew of local reports such as the 2019 Savannah Morning News article, "Crunching the numbers on SCAD and a PILOT program."

In 2015 Wallace launched a video series called On Creativity, which first aired as Delta Air Lines in-flight entertainment. In it, she interviewed celebrities such as Mindy Kaling, Lauren Bush Lauren, Christian Siriano, and David Muir. The series' final episode was in July, 2023. In addition to writing a number of publications on design and children's books, in April 2016 Wallace released a ghostwritten memoir, The Bee and the Acorn, detailing her experiences as a co-founder and president of SCAD and the development of the university.

As President of SCAD, Wallace earned $9.6 million in 2014, according to The Wall Street Journal. The newspaper's report on nonprofit compensation found Wallace to be the highest-paid college leader and the eighth-highest-paid employee of an American charity. The $9.6 million included a base salary of $859,000, a bonus of $1 million and $7.5 million in deferred payments. For the 2022 tax year, Wallace and her new husband Glenn Wallace earned in excess of $3.5 million.

== Bibliography ==
- A House in the South (Clarkson Potter 2006, co-authored with Frances Schultz)
- Perfect Porches: Designing Welcoming Spaces for Outdoor Living (Random House 2010)
- The World of Birthdays: Life Around the World (Gareth Stevens Publishing 2003)
- The World of Food: Life Around the World (Gareth Stevens Publishing 2003)
- The World of Holidays: Life Around the World (Gareth Stevens Publishing 2003)
- The World of Sports: Life Around the World (Gareth Stevens Publishing 2003)
- Le Royaume de Woo (Editions Milan 2004)
- The Bee and the Acorn (Assouline Publishing 2016)
- Lessons in Leadership (SCAD University Press January 20, 2024)

== Honors ==
- Presidential Citizens Medal from The White House, January 2, 2025.
- International Art Adviser by Chinese Red Sandalwood Museum in Beijing, China
- Inaugural Elle Décor Vision Award from Elle Décor magazine
- Chevalier dans l'Ordre des Palmes Académiques, awarded by the French Embassy in the U.S.
- Member of the National Advisory Board of the National Museum of Women in the Arts (Washington, D.C.)
- James T. Deason Human Relations Award and the W.W. Law Legacy Award
- "100 Most Influential Georgians" by Georgia Trend magazine
- DesignIntelligence's 30 Most Admired Educators
- Distinguished Alumnus Award from the Georgia State University College of Education
- Honorary Doctor of Laws by Gonzaga University
- Sustainability Award from Fashion Group International
- Georgia Historical Society 2015 Georgia Trustee
- Phoenix Award from Mayor of Atlanta
- The American Institute of Architects Roger Milliken Honorary AIA Legacy Award
- The Institute for Classical Architecture and Art Arthur Ross Award for Stewardship
