= William G. Preston =

American architect (1842–1910)

William Gibbons Preston FAIA
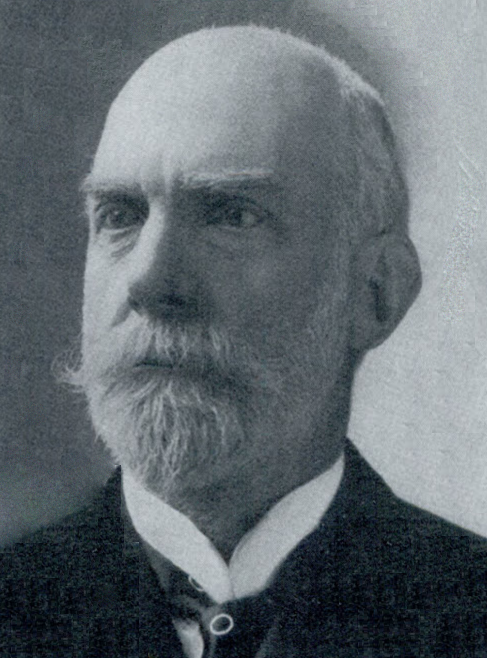
- Born: September 29, 1842; Boston, Massachusetts, U.S.
- Died: April 26, 1910 (aged 67); Brookline, Massachusetts, U.S.
- Education: Harvard University; École des Beaux-Arts
- Occupation: Architect

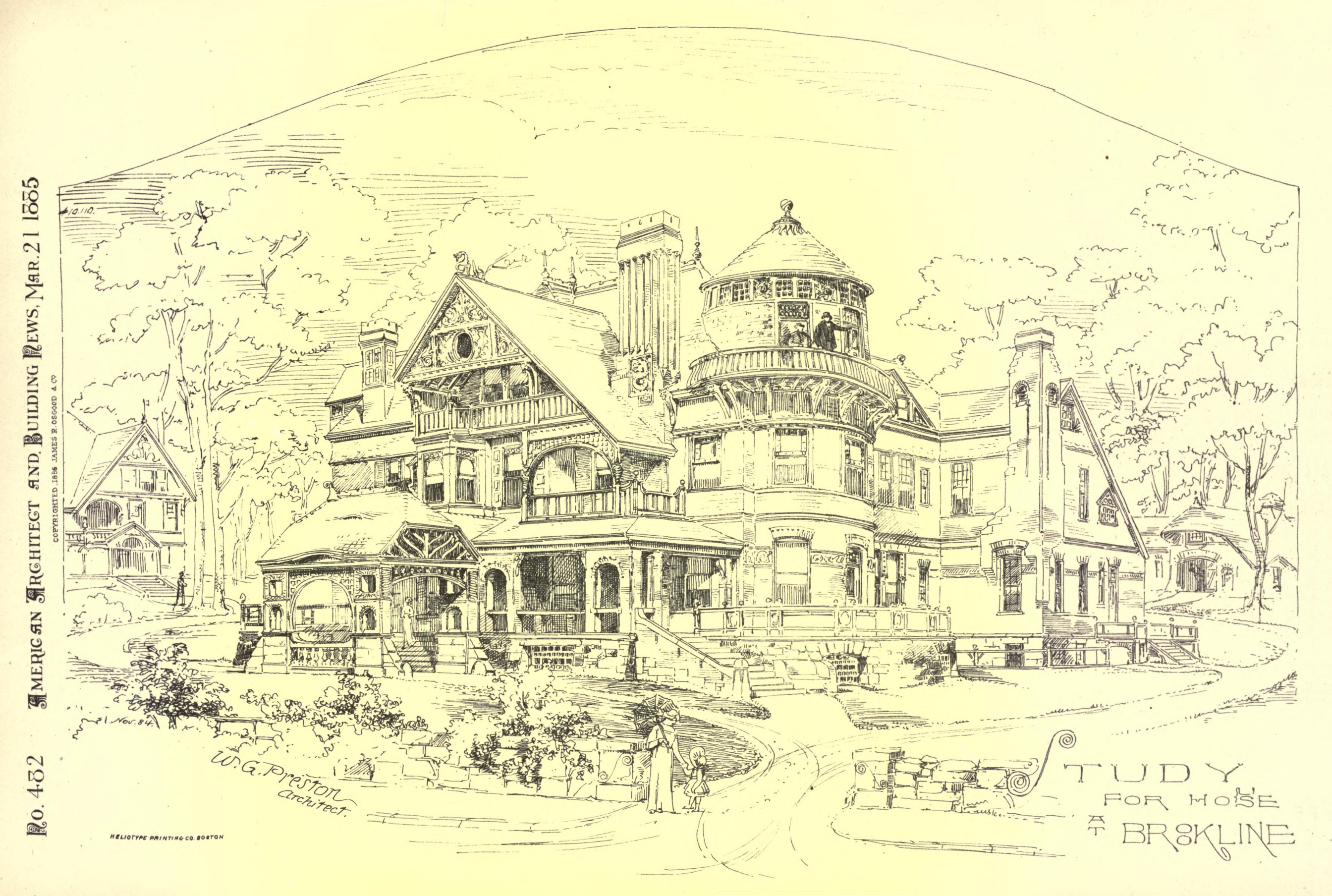
Image of "Study for House at Brookline" which appeared in the March 21, 1885 edition of American Architect and Building News. The house was built at 137 Gardner Road in 1884 for Amasa Clarke, a prominent woolens manufacturer. It is no longer standing.

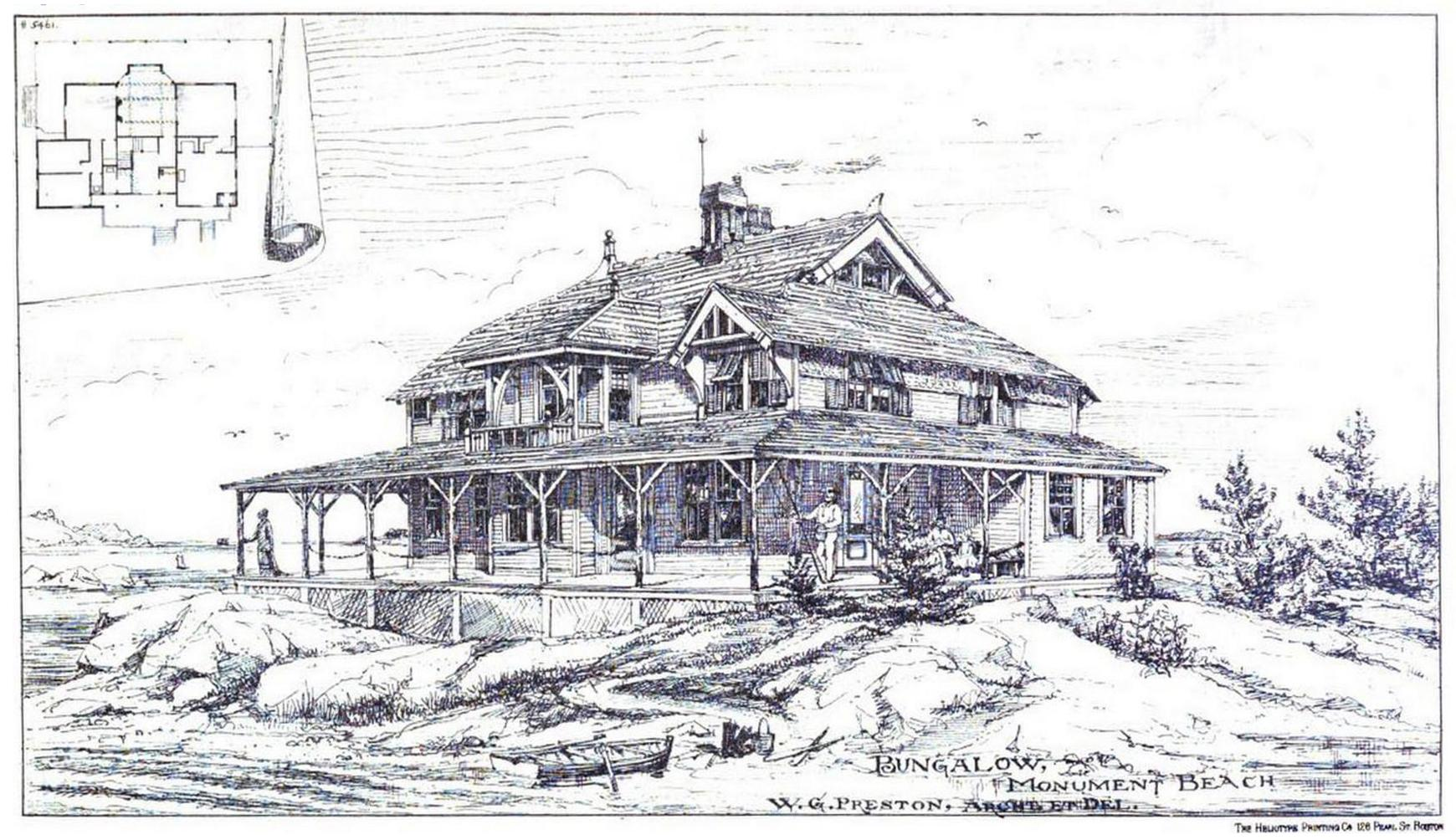
"Bungalow at Monument Beach, Massachusetts" (1879) from the March 27, 1880 edition of American Architect and Building News

William Gibbons Preston (September 29, 1842 – March 26, 1910) was an American architect who practiced during the last third of the nineteenth century and in the first decade of the twentieth. Educated at Harvard University and the École des Beaux-Arts in Paris, he was active in Boston, New York, Rhode Island, Ohio, New Brunswick and Savannah, Georgia, where he was brought by George Johnson Baldwin to design the Chatham County courthouse. Preston stayed in Savannah for several years during which time designed the original Desoto Hotel (1890, demolished 1965), the Savannah Volunteer Guards Armory and 20 other distinguished public buildings and private homes. He began his professional career working for his father, the builder and architect Jonathan Preston (1801–1888), upon his return to the United States from the École in 1861, and was the sole practitioner in the office from the time his father retired c. 1875 until he took John Kahlmeyer as a partner in about 1885.

The drawings of the Preston firm, now owned by the Boston Public Library, make up "...one of the most complete sets of architectural graphics preserved from the nineteenth century." Many of his buildings were pictured as prints in American Architect and Building News. He is credited with the introduction of the bungalow to the United States through a house loosely of the type that he designed in Monument Beach, Massachusetts in 1879. Preston was an early historic preservationist. He was influential in the successful 1896 effort to prevent the Massachusetts state legislature from demolishing Boston's historic State House, which had been designed by the noted architect Charles Bulfinch and built in 1798. Bulfinch was also an architect of the Capitol building in Washington, D.C.

Preston ran his practice for many years from a commercial and office building located at 186 Devonshire Street. He designed Massachusetts Institute of Technology's Rogers Building in 1864, located on Boylston Street near Boston's Copley Square, which housed the school's architecture department. Floor plans for the building show a large, centrally located space devoted to an architectural library and museum. Drawings from the Study Collection were hung on the studio walls and numerous casts and other artifacts also lined the walls and picture rails.

Preston married Estelle M. Evans (1847–1920), whose father was the wealthy real estate developer Brice S. Evans, on December 6, 1866, and the couple had one son, Evans (1867–1900). William was an active member and fellow of the American Institute of Architects and served that organization in the office of first vice-president at the end of the 1890s. He was for many years a member of the Boston Society of Architects, and for thirty years served as its treasurer. He died at his home at 1063 Beacon Street in Brookline in 1910.

== Selected projects ==
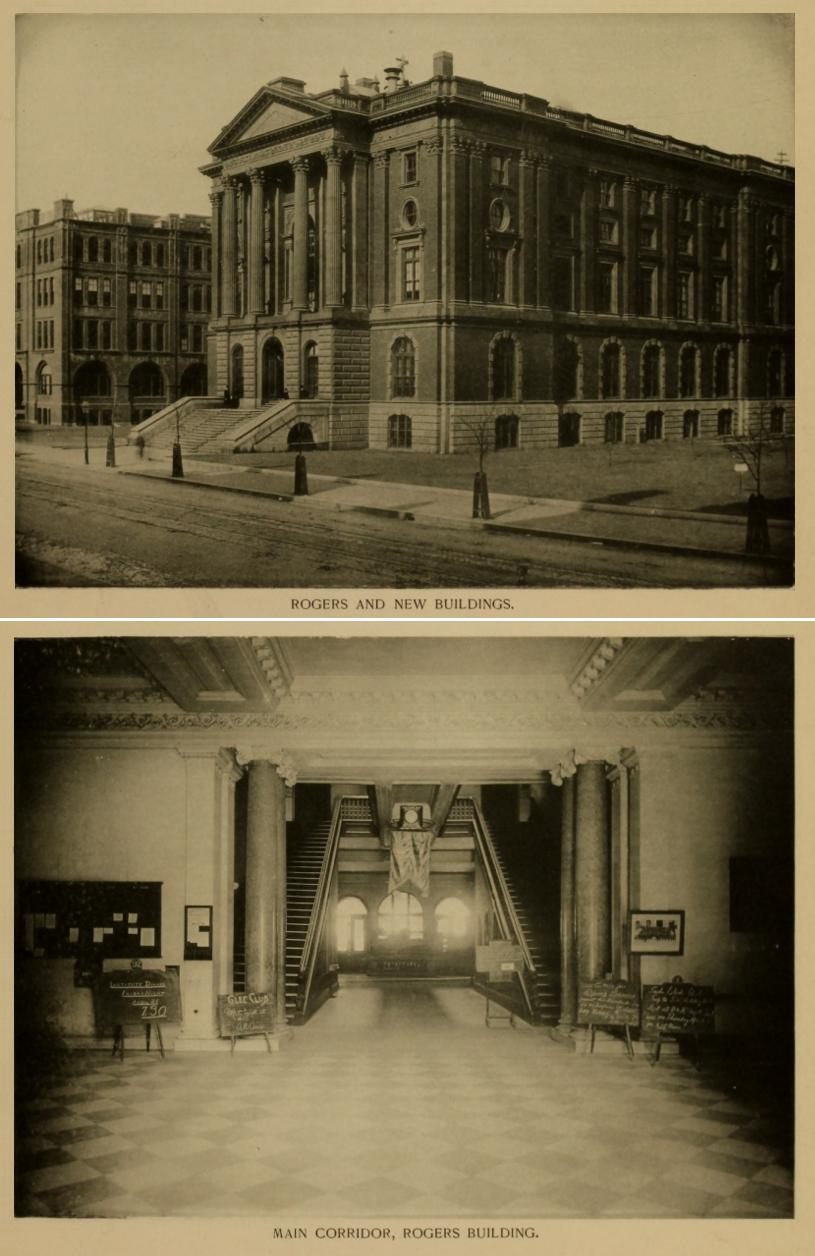
Images of the exterior and main hall of the Rogers Building, 1864, Massachusetts Institute of Technology (The Walker Building is in the background in the upper view.)

- Rogers Building of the Massachusetts Institute of Technology, (1864, demolished 1939) 491 Boylston Street, Boston MA., with his father Jonathan Preston
- New England Museum of Natural History (1865, with Jonathan Preston, extant) 234 Berkeley Street, Boston – after a fifteen-month restoration in 2013 now RH Boston.
- Charles Edward Cook house (c. 1870 – extant) 1 Gloucester St., Boston
- Hotel Vendome (1871 – extant) 160 Commonwealth Avenue, Boston, corner section by Preston, remainder by J.F. Ober and R. Rand in 1881
- World's Peace Jubilee Coliseum, 1872, Dartmouth Street and St. James Avenue, Boston
- George H. Fales house (1873 – extant) 27 W. Main St., West Brookfield, Mass.
- Massachusetts State Prison – Third Place winning entry, (1874)
- Moody and Sankey Tabernacle, Tremont Street, Boston (1876, demolished c. 1883) now the site of Boston Center for the Arts
- J.C. Gilbert House(1876, extant) 40 Vautrinot Ave., Hull, Mass.
- Thomas–Webster Estate, main house (1878 – extant) 238 Webster Street, Marshfield, Mass.
- Exhibition building at Rio de Janeiro (1878 – status unknown)
- Charles H. Bradshaw house, (1878, extant) 175 Summer Street, Spring Hill (Somerville), Mass.
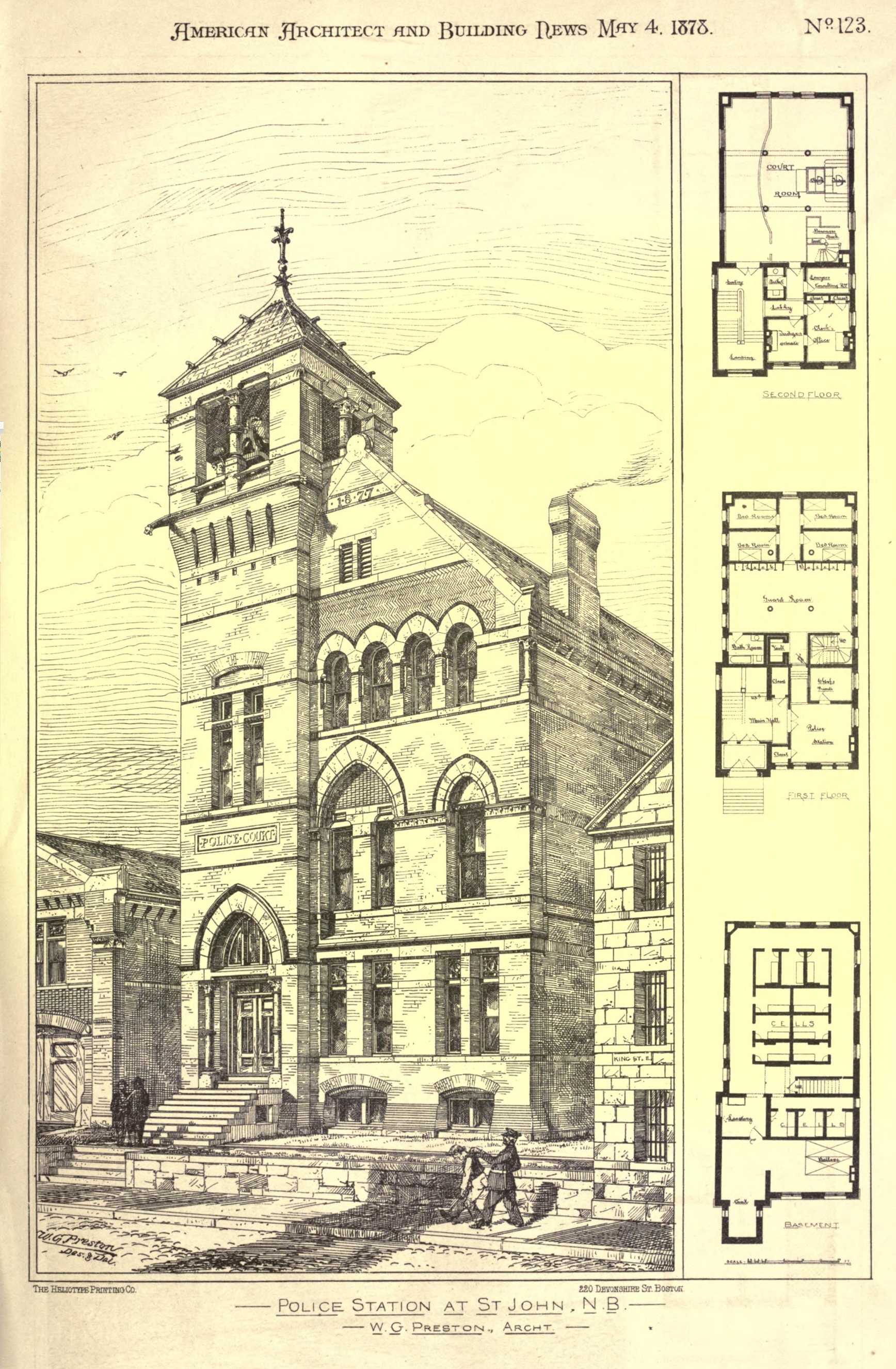
- Police station, 1878, Saint John, New Brunswick
  Police Station and Jail, (1878, demolished c.1975) 128 King Street E., Saint John, New Brunswick, Canada
- Seashore House, (1879, extant) 30 Highland Ave, Hull, Mass.
- Bungalow (1879 – status unknown) address unknown Monument Beach, Mass.
- Mason Building, Liberty Square, (1880 – demolished) 70 Kilby Street, Boston
- Proposal for an International Exposition Building for the 1883 New York World's Fair (1880 – fair never held)
- Massachusetts Charitable Mechanic Association building (1881, demolished 1959) Huntington Avenue and West Newton Street, Boston
- Hull Yacht Club, (1882, demolished) 63 Highland Ave., Hull, Mass.
- C. Kennard House, (1882, extant) 42 Western Ave., Hull, Mass.
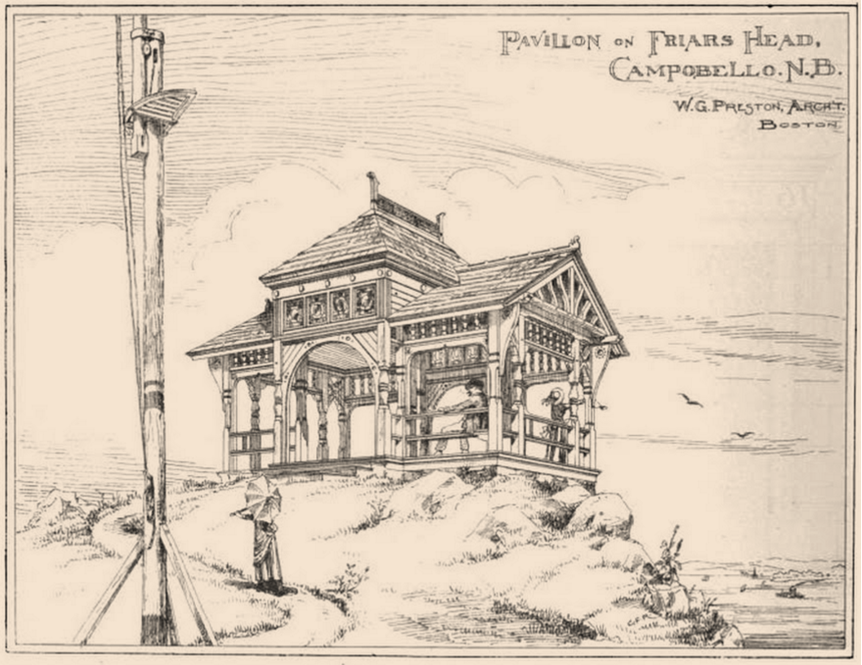
- Pavilion at Friars Head,1882, Campobello, New Brunswick
  Pavilion at Friars Head (1882 – status not known) Campobello, New Brunswick
- Jacob Sleeper Hall, Boston University, (1883, demolished) 688 Boylston Street, Boston
- The Hotel Aubry (1883, demolished 1959) 149 Newbury Street, Boston (W.G. Preston & Albert C. Fernald)
- Lincoln Public Library (1884, extant, with subsequent additions by others) 3 Bedford Road Lincoln, Mass.
- Claflin Building (1884, extant), 20 Beacon Street, Boston, renovation of an 1873 building by others as the building for the Boston University School of Religious Education and Social Service, named for university founder Jacob Claflin. Alexander Graham Bell taught vocal physiology in the building. It has also held retail businesses and is now a residential condominium building.
- Boston Terra Cotta Company's "New Building" (1885, demolished) 394 Federal St., Boston MA

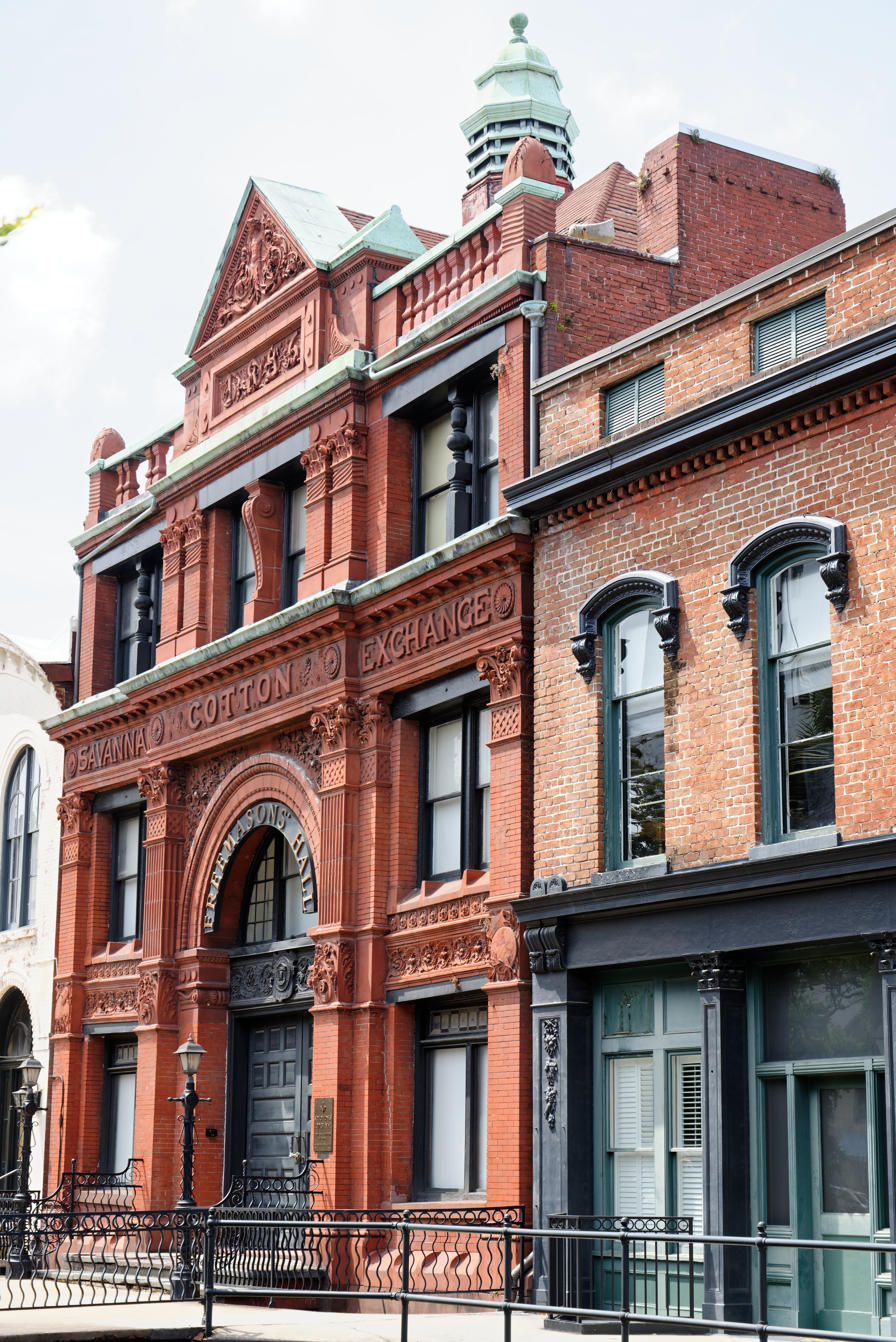
Savannah Cotton Exchange

- Savannah Cotton Exchange (1886, extant) 100 E. Bay Street, Savannah GA
- Greene's Inn (1887, – burned c.1980 and subsequently demolished) 175 Ocean Road, Narragansett Pier, RI
- George Johnson Baldwin house (1887, extant) – 225 E. Hall, Savannah, GA. This house is notable for its "...tall ribbed chimneys and the elaborate stepped dormer(s)."
- Chadwick Lead Works, (1887, extant) 176–184 High Street, Boston
- "Gardencourt" Charles H. Pope house (c. 1888 – extant) 10 Gibson Avenue, Narragansett Pier, RI now expanded and converted to a condominium community.
- Union Society Building (1889, extant) 121–125 Whitaker St., Savannah GA
- Chatham County (GA) Courthouse (1889, extant), 124 Bull Street, Savannah, GA
- Hotel De Soto (1890, demolished 1968), E. Liberty Street at Drayton Street, Savannah, GA, now the site of the Hilton DeSoto Hotel.
- Charles M. Russell mansion(1890 – demolished in 1966 and replaced by a Goodyear store) 328 Lincoln Way East, Massillon, OH
- St. Luke's Lutheran Church (1890, extant) Marlon Avenue and Park Avenue West, Mansfield, OH. Repurposed as a home.
- Francis H. Dewey house "Stonecroft" (1891 – extant) 362 Ocean Road, Narragansett Pier, RI
- Marion Music Hall (1891 – extant) 164 Front Street, Marion, Mass.
- Armory of the First Corps of Cadets of the Massachusetts Volunteer Militia (1891, completed 1897, extant), 97–105 Arlington Street, Boston, pictured on August 20, 1892, American Architect and Building News
- John Hancock Building (Devonshire) (1891, demolished c.1903) 178 Devonshire Street, Boston
- Savannah Volunteer Guards Armory, (1893, extant) 90–92 (now 342) Bull Street, Savannah, GA, now Poetter Hall, Savannah College of Art and Design.
- Central Exchange Building, (c.1895 – extant) 340 Main Street, Worcester, Mass.
- Templeton Farm Colony of the Massachusetts School for the Feeble-Minded (Now Templeton Developmental Center), (1899, extant) 126 Royalston Road, Templeton, Mass.
- Boston Transit Commission Building (1903, extant) 15 Beacon Street, Boston
- Dormitories and Electric Plant for the Massachusetts School for the Feeble-Minded (after 1925 the Walter E. Fernald State School), (1902, 1905, extant), 200 Trapelo Road, Waltham, Mass.
- International Trust Company Building (1906 – extant) 45 Milk Street, Boston, substantial expansion of existing building by others. (Note: It has been designated by the Boston Landmarks Commission and the National Register of Historic Places as a historic landmark.)
- Quincy Market Cold Storage Warehouse (1906, demolished) 21–33 Eastern Avenue, Boston
- Barn for the Massachusetts State Sanatorium (1908, demolished) State Hospital Road, Rutland, Mass.
- Central Station of West End Street Railway Company, Boston
- Boston Public Garden footbridge
Buildings in New York, Ohio and Rhode Island

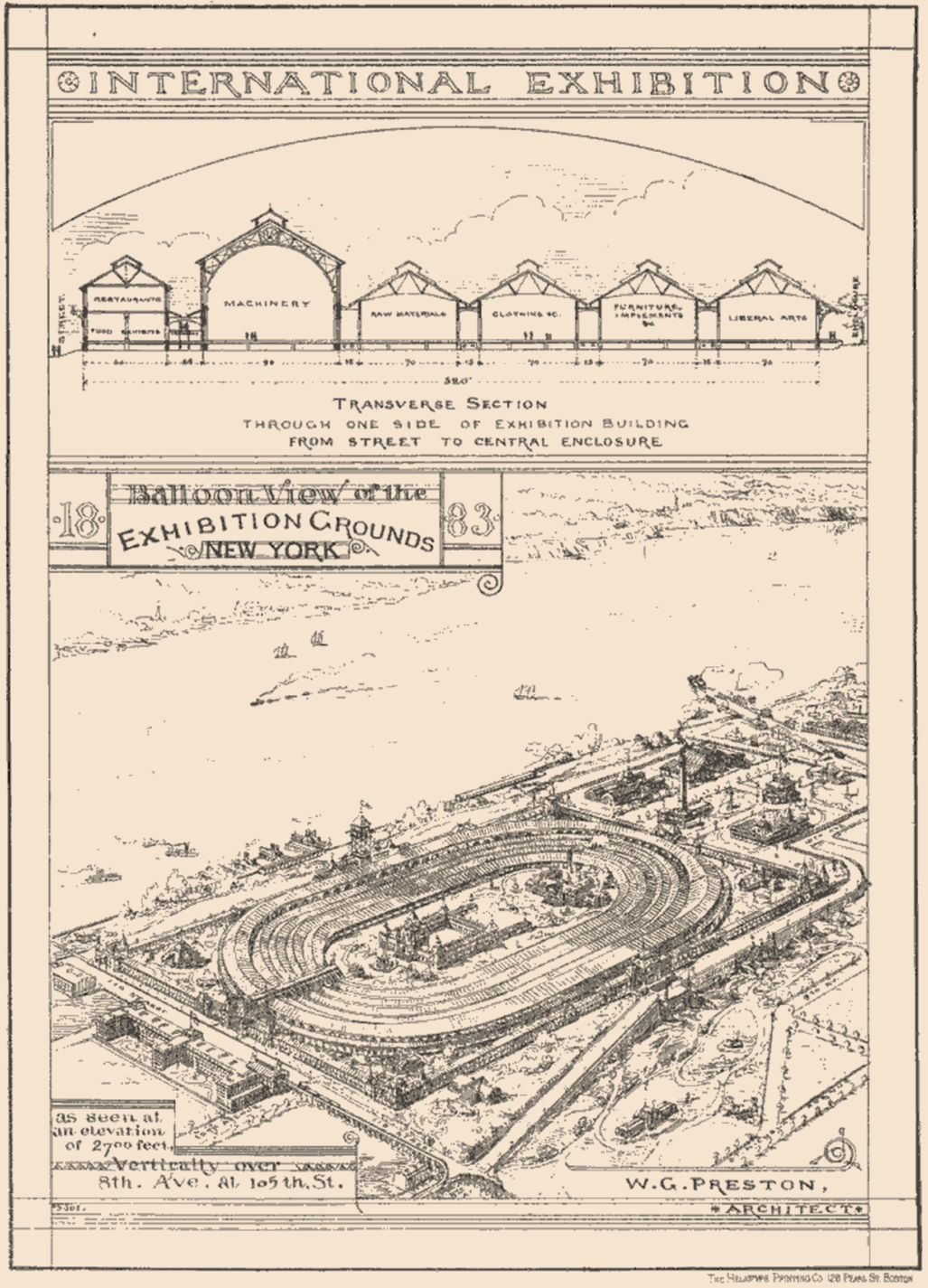
International Exposition Building, 1880

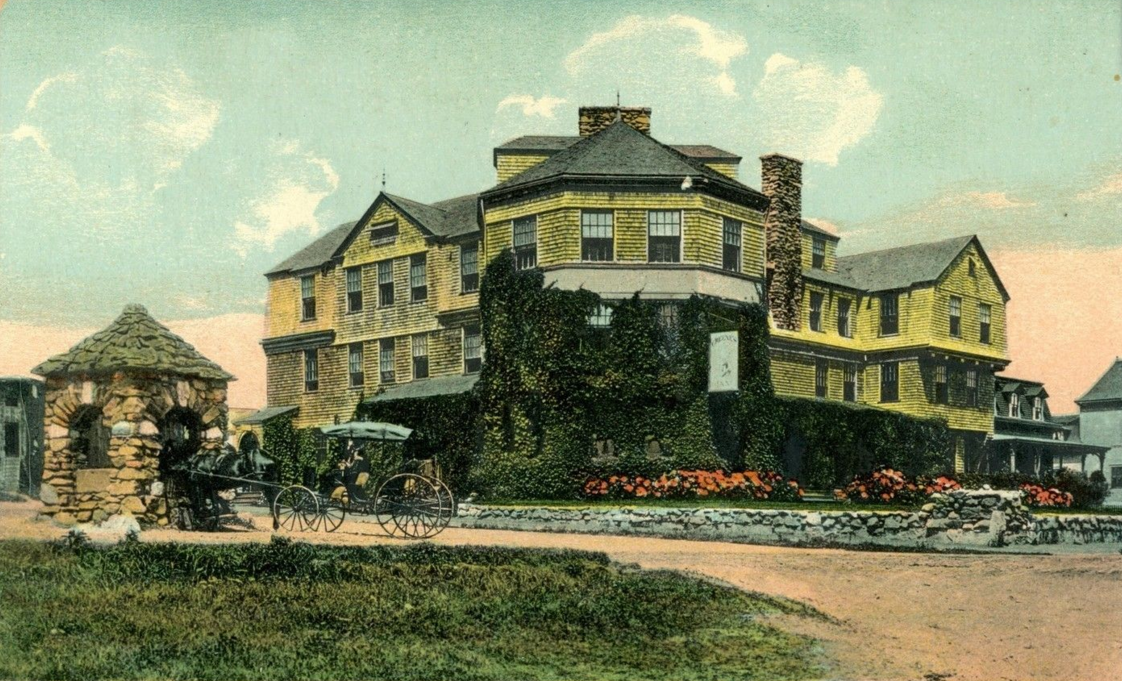
Greene's Inn, 1887

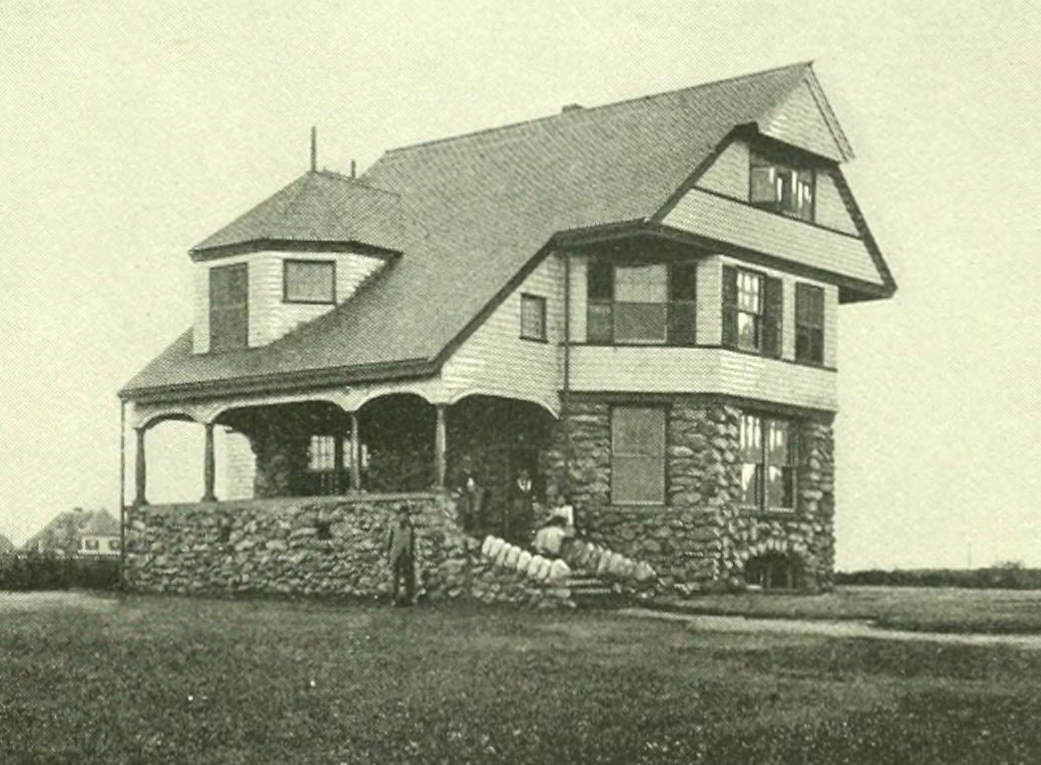
"Gardencourt" Charles H. Pope house, 1888

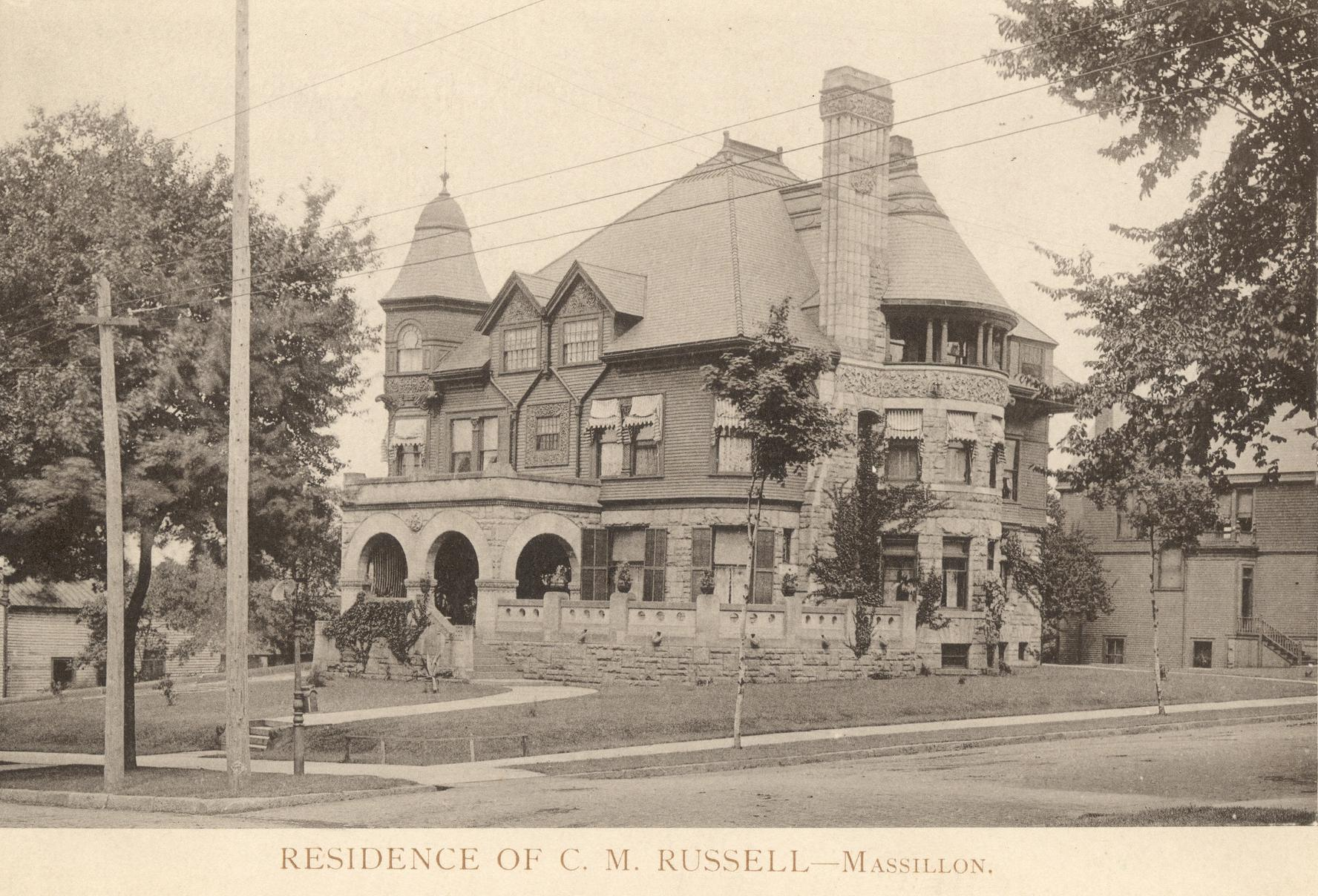
Charles M. Russell house, 1890

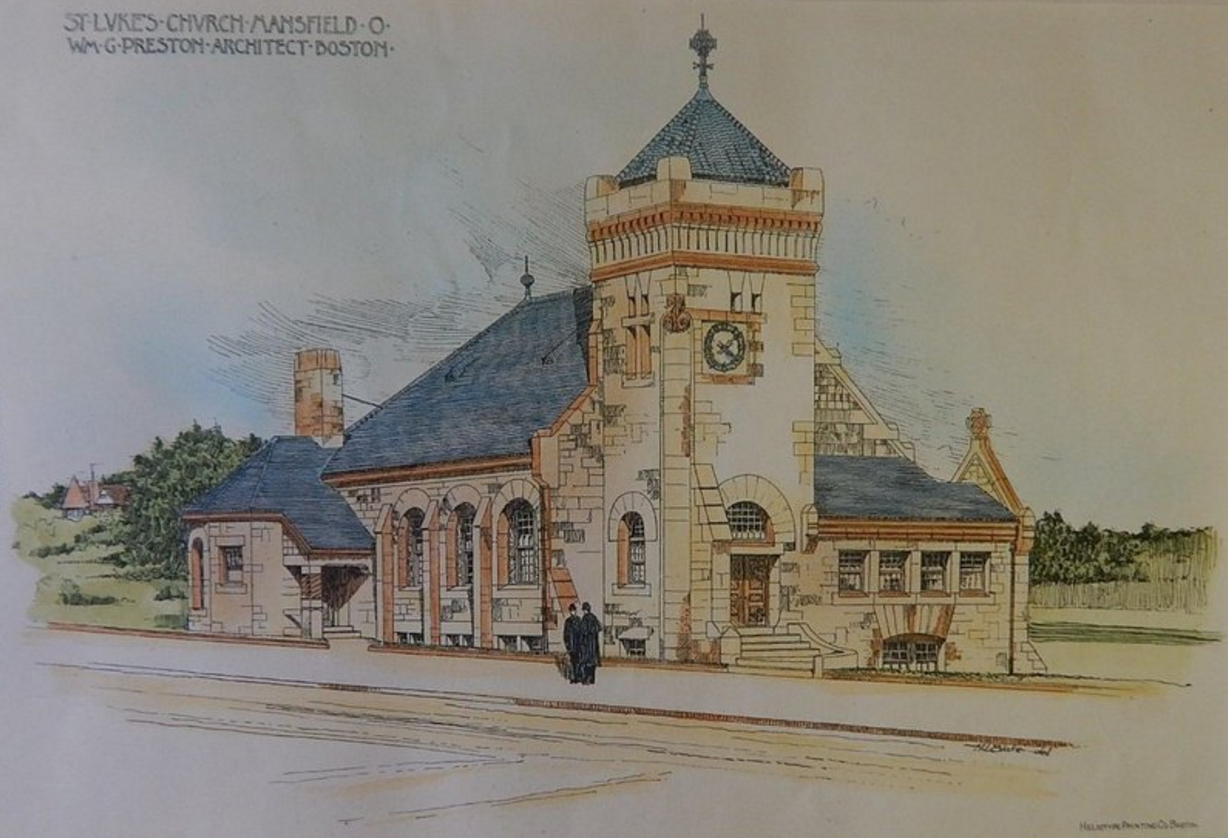
St. Luke's Lutheran Church, 1890

Buildings in Boston, Massachusetts

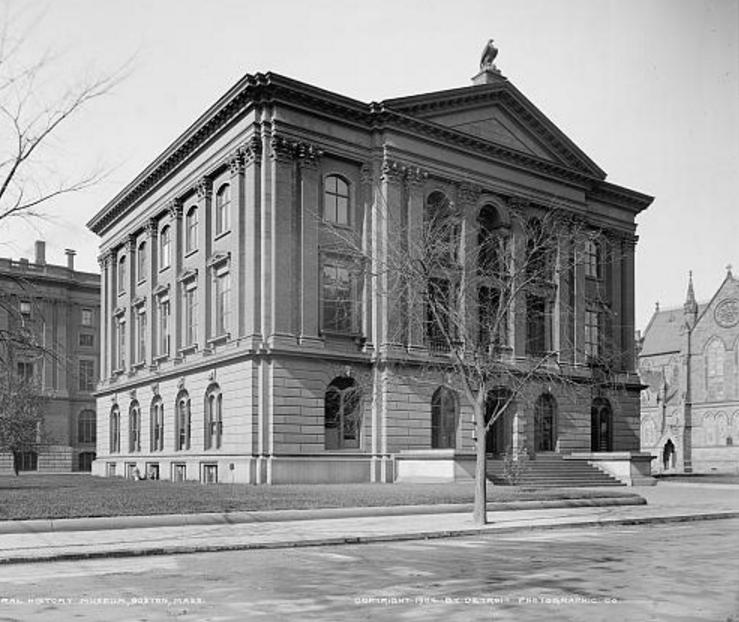
New England Natural History Museum, 1865

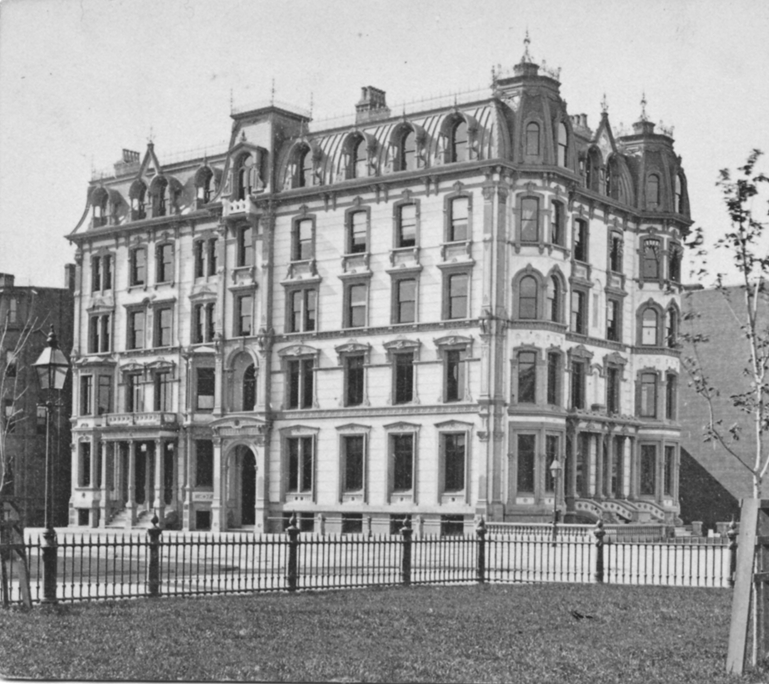
Hotel Vendome, 1871, before additions by others

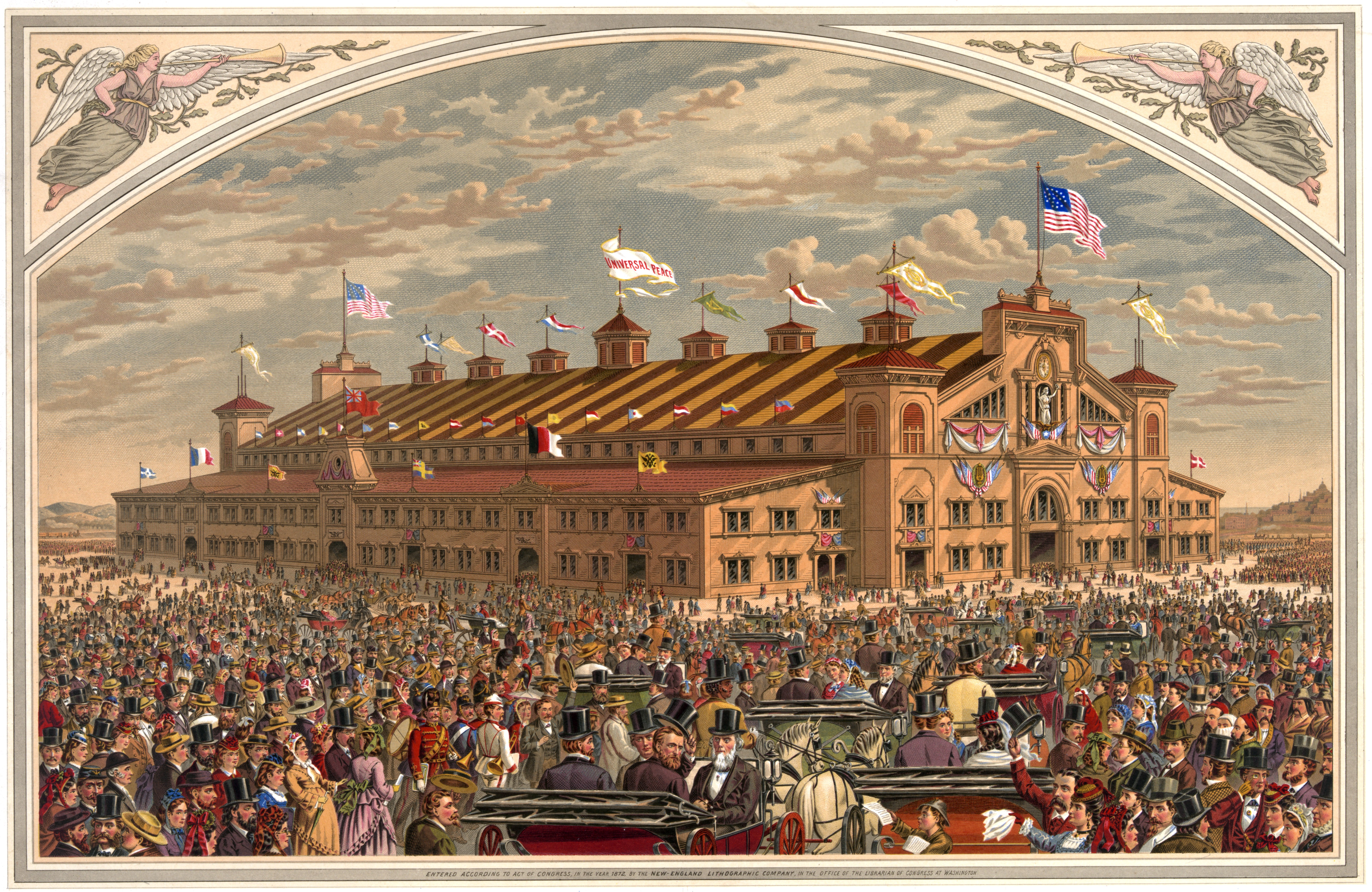
World's Peace Jubilee Coliseum, 1872

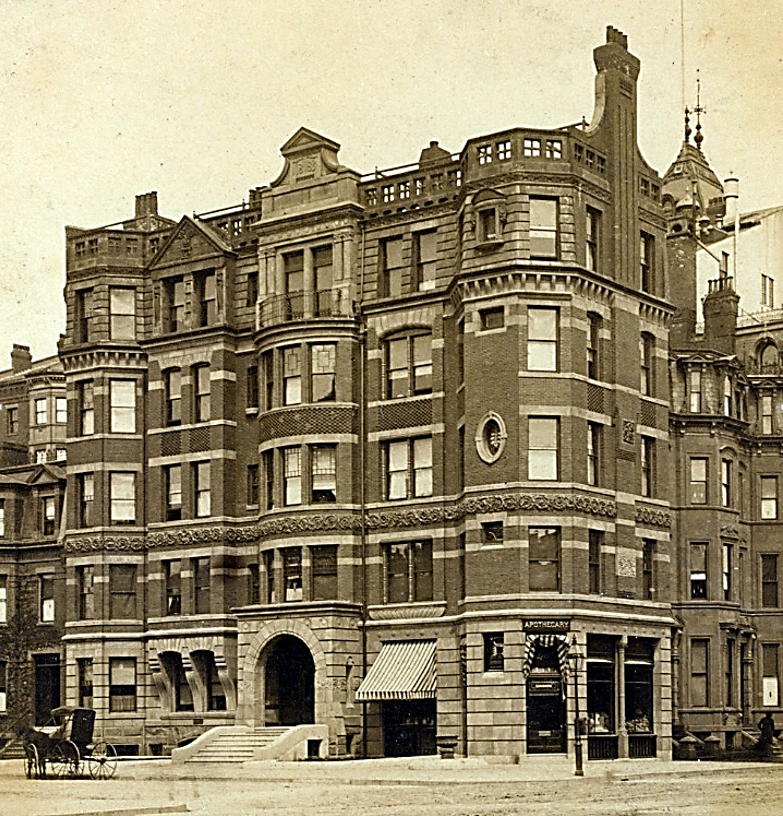
The Hotel Aubry, 1883

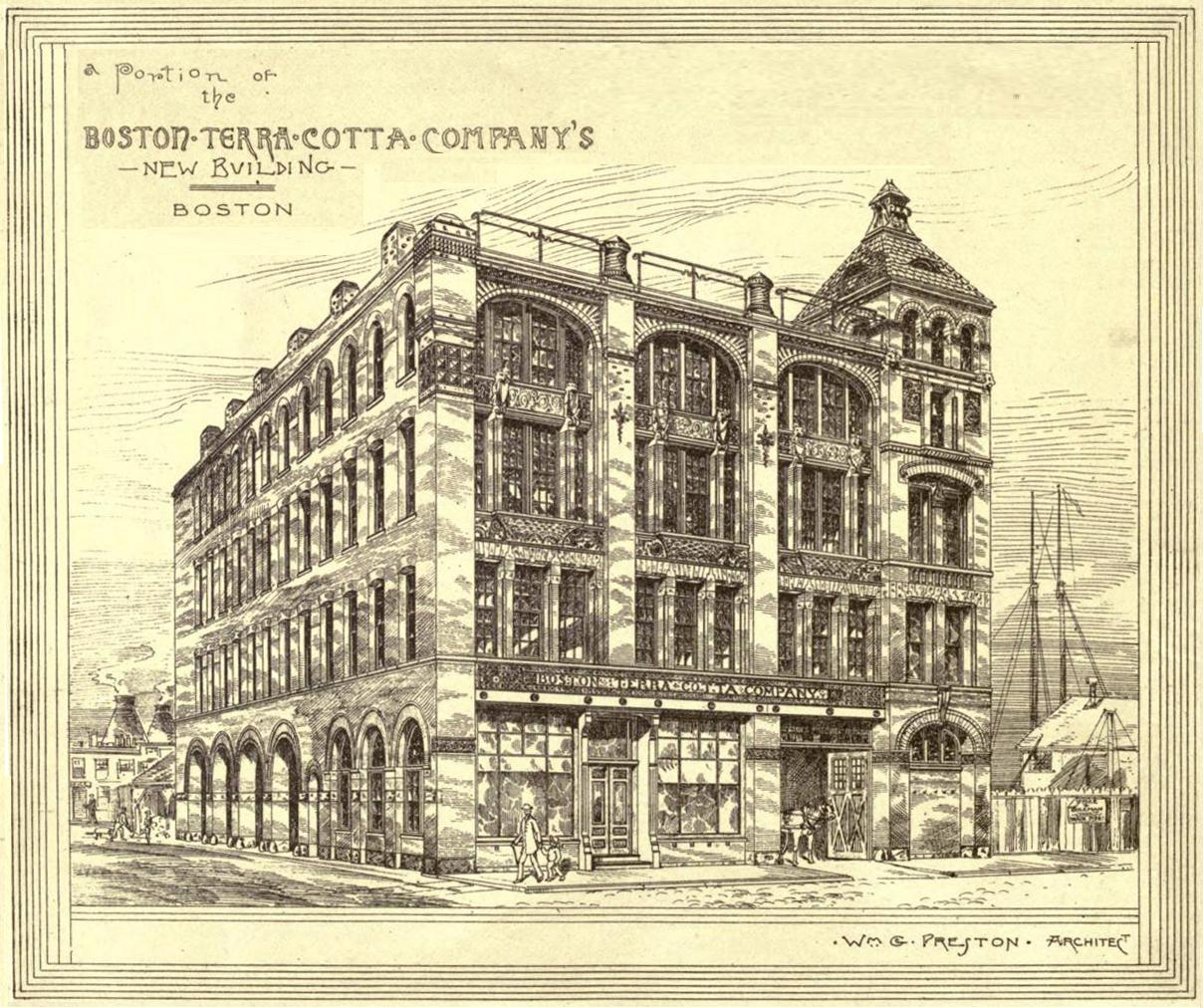
Boston Terra Cotta Company, 1885

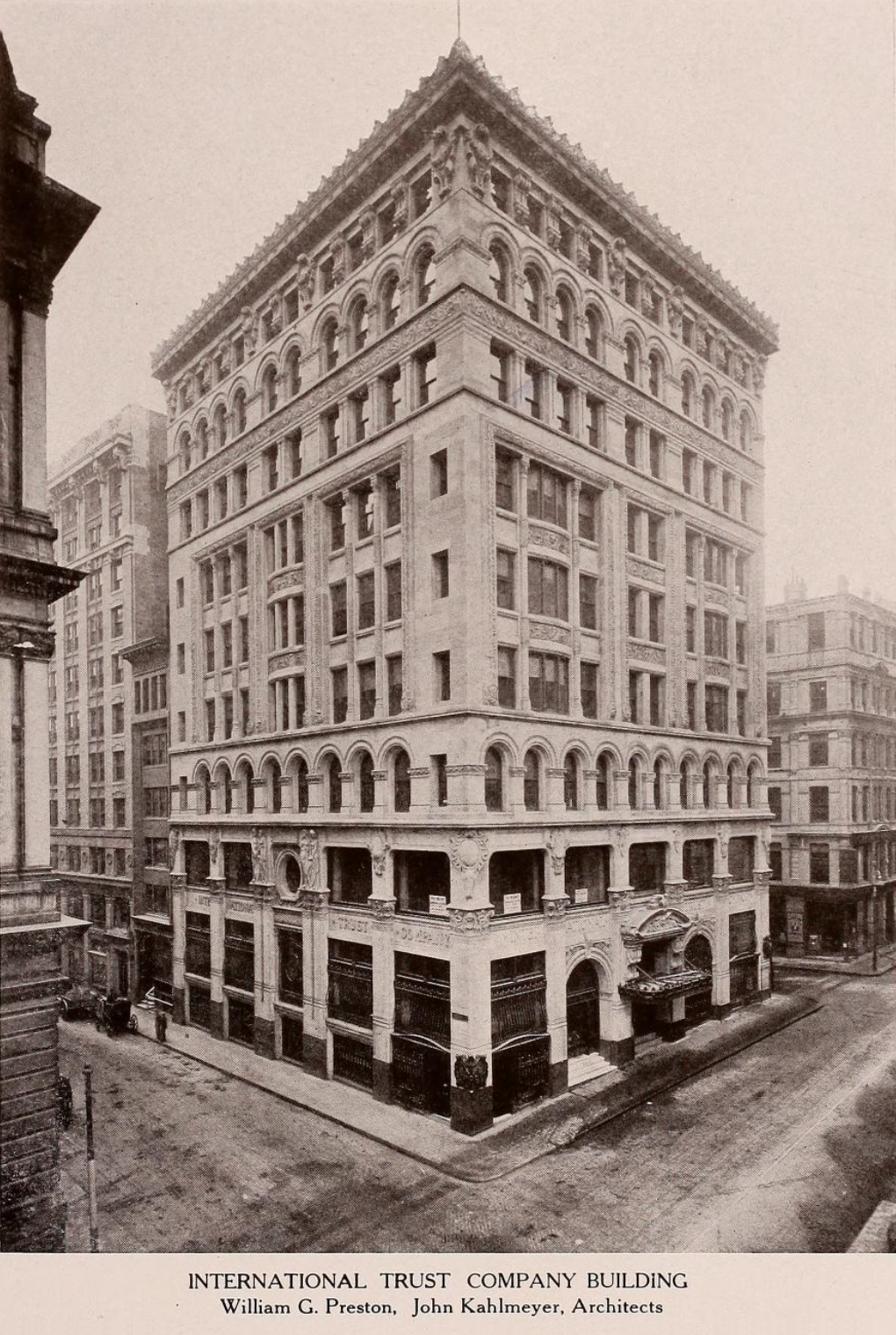
International Trust Company Building, 1906

Buildings in Massachusetts outside of Boston

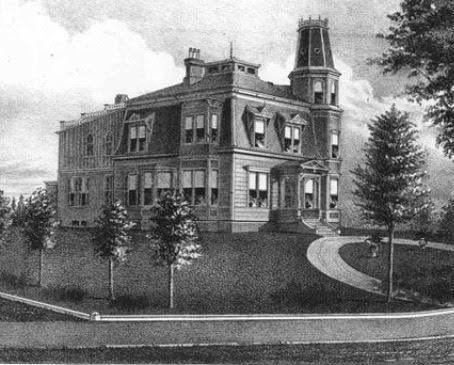
George Henry Fales residence, 1873

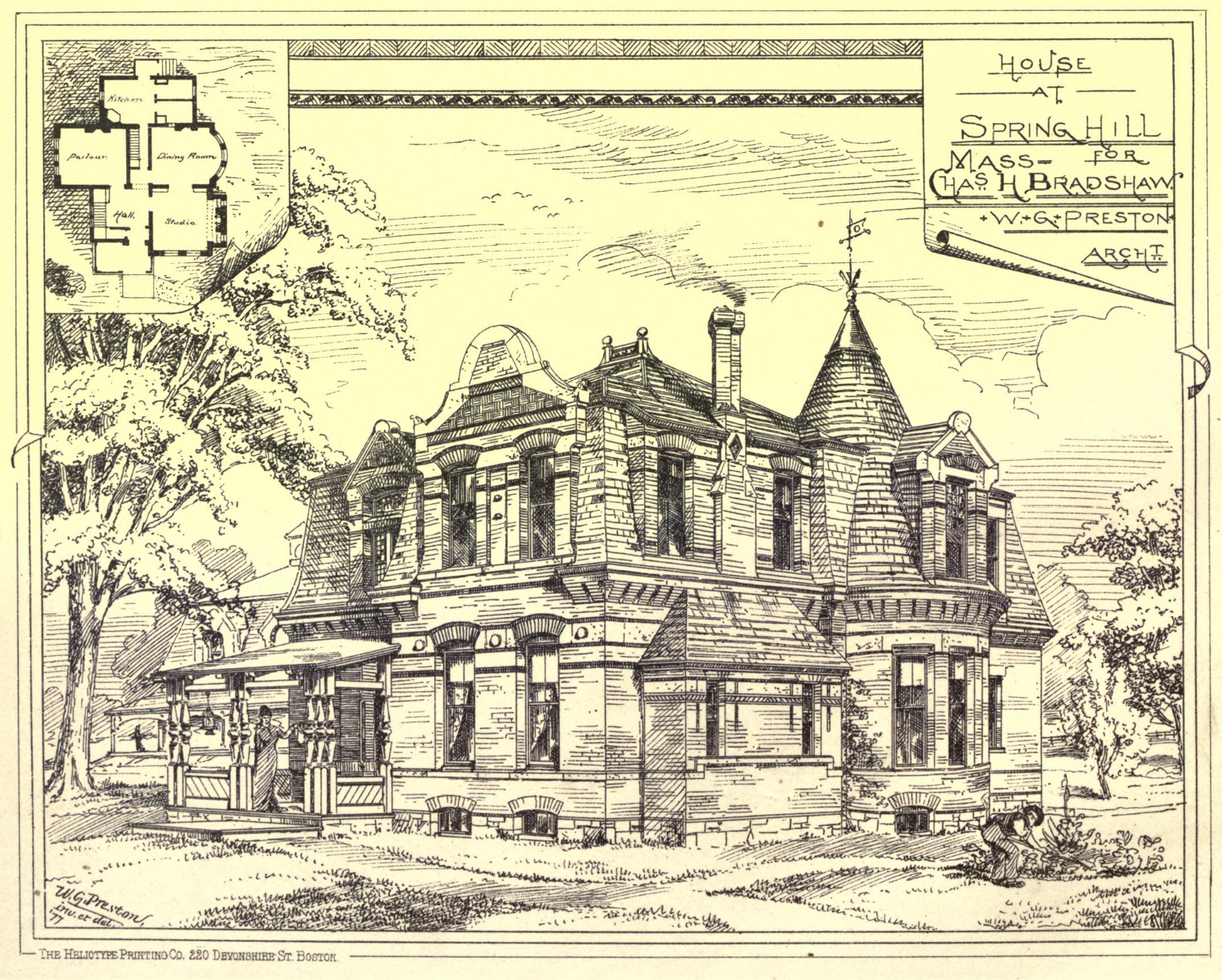
Charles H. Bradshaw house, 1878

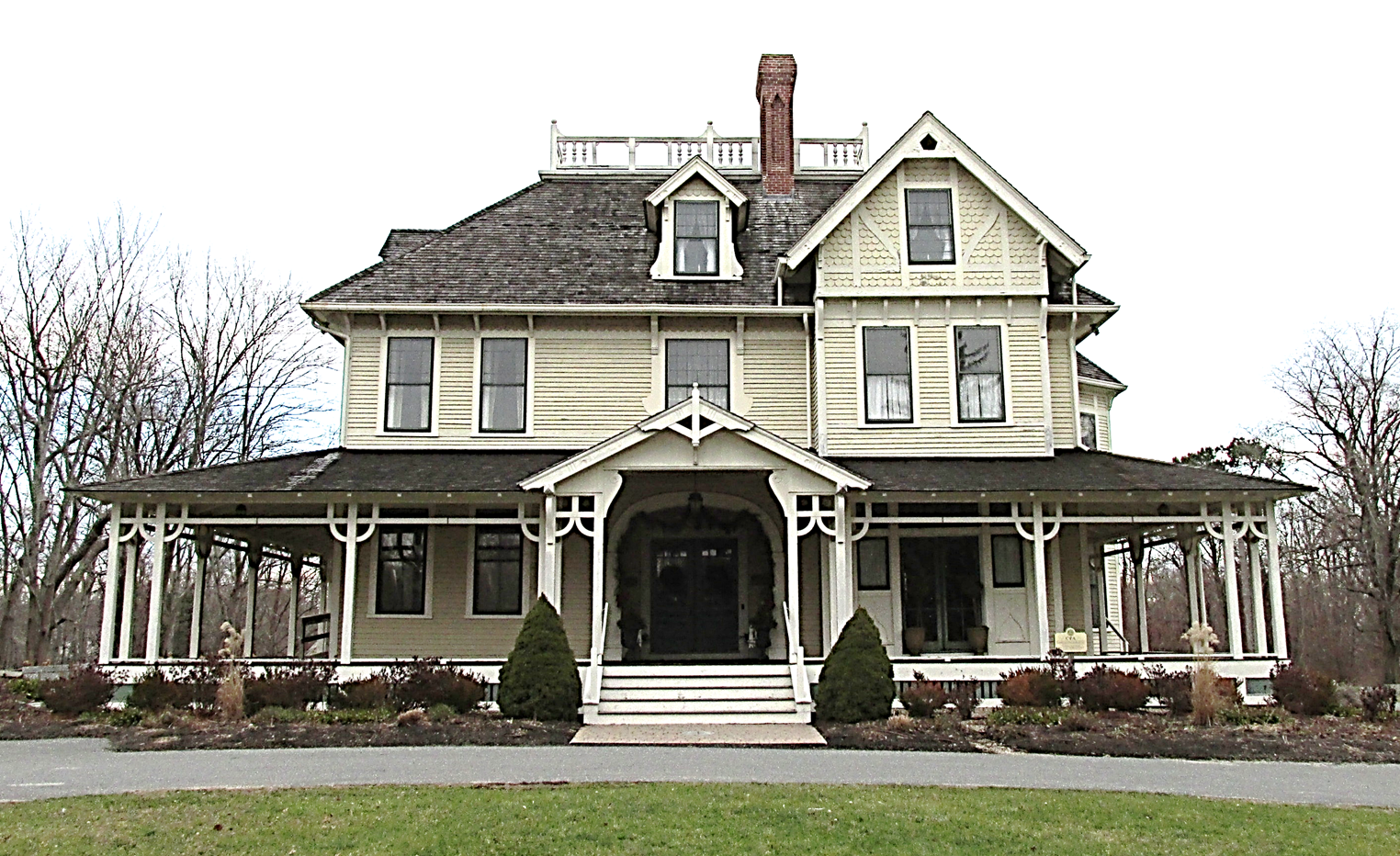
Thomas-Webster Estate, 1878

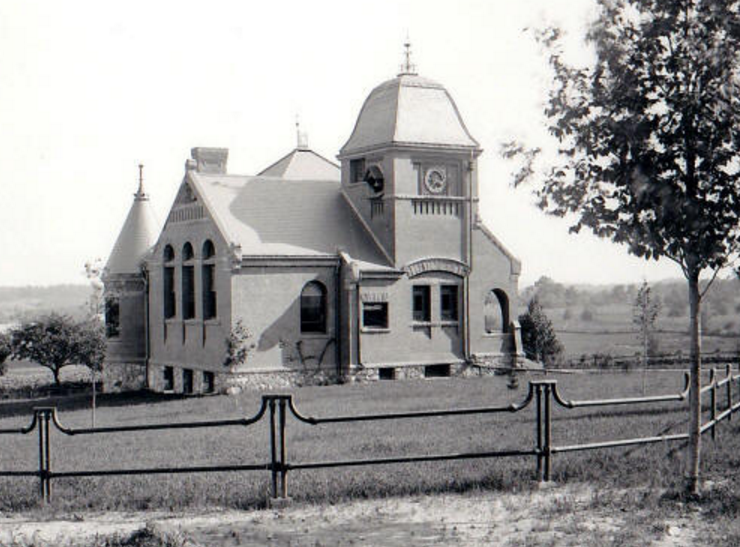
Lincoln Public Library, 1884

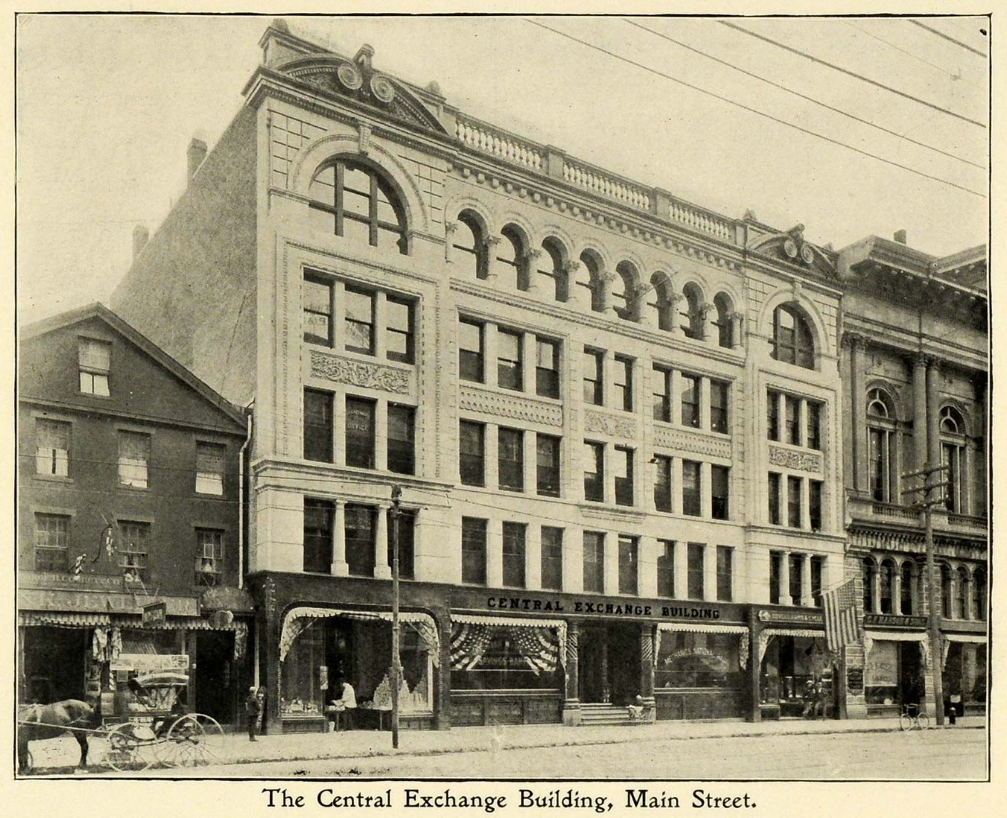
Central Exchange Building, 1896

Buildings in Savannah, Georgia

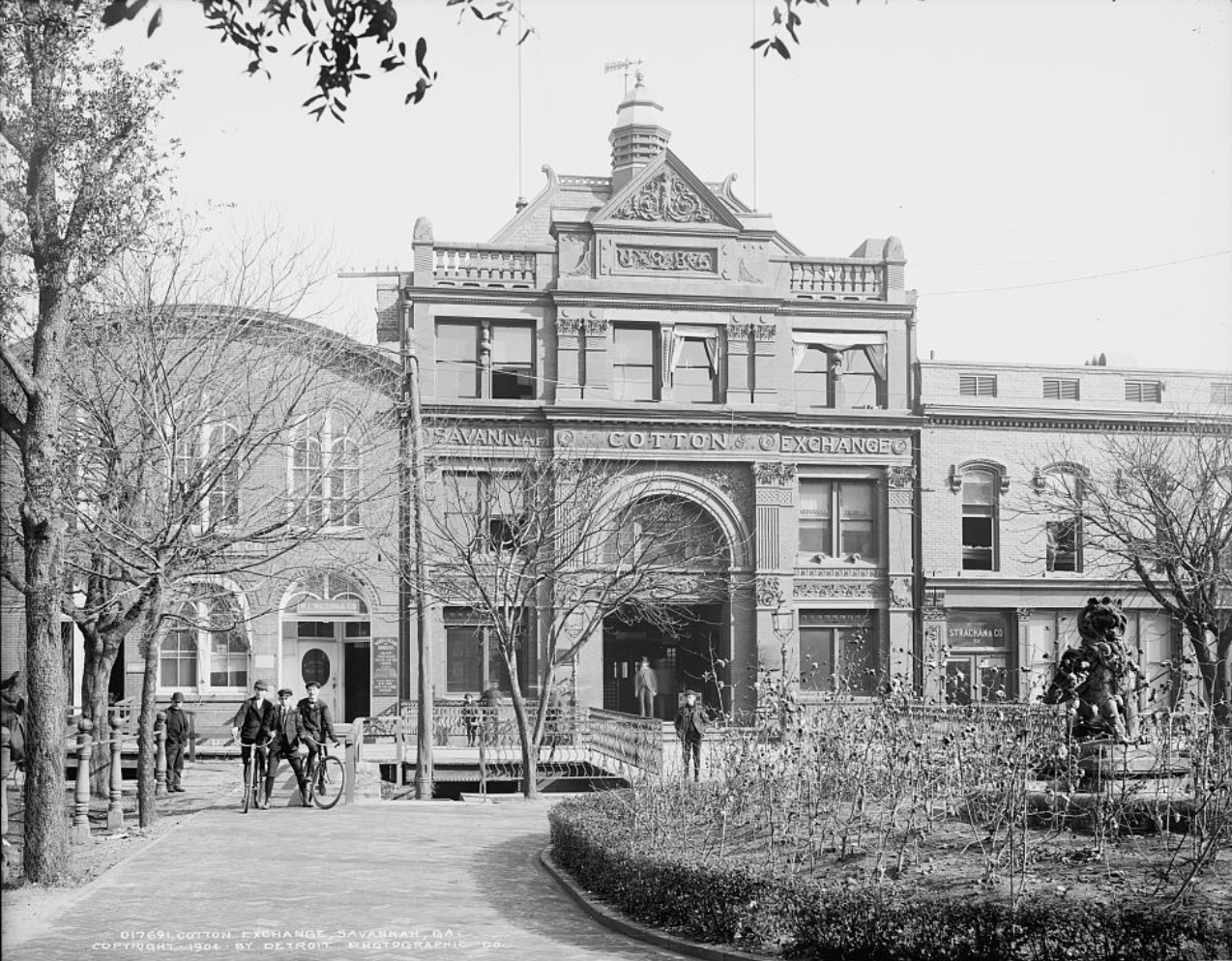
Savannah Cotton Exchange, 1886

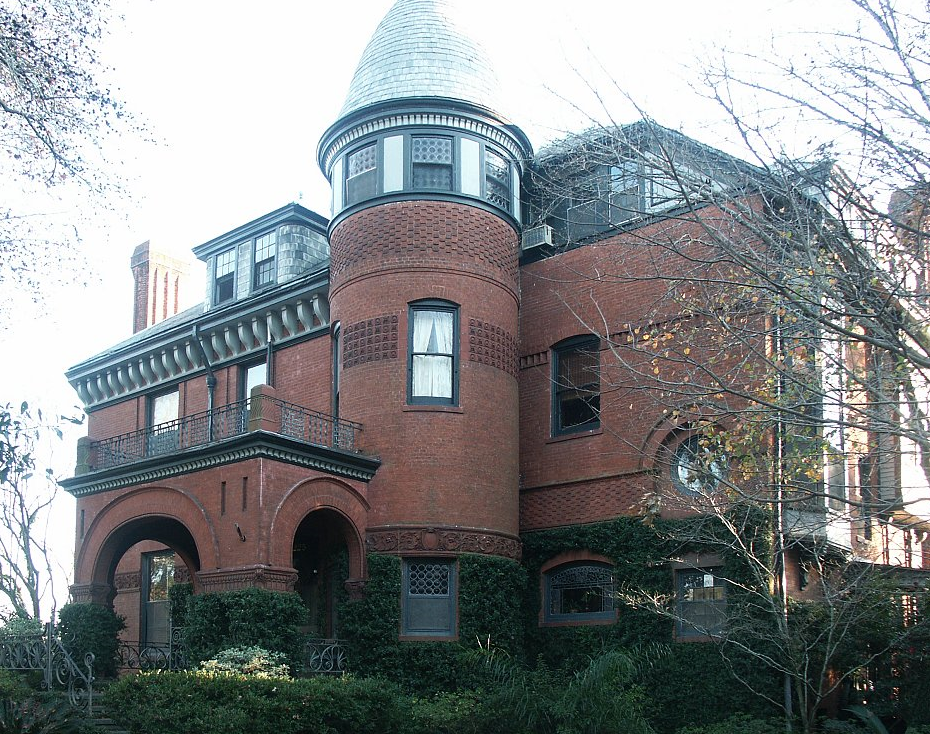
George Johnson Baldwin house, 1887

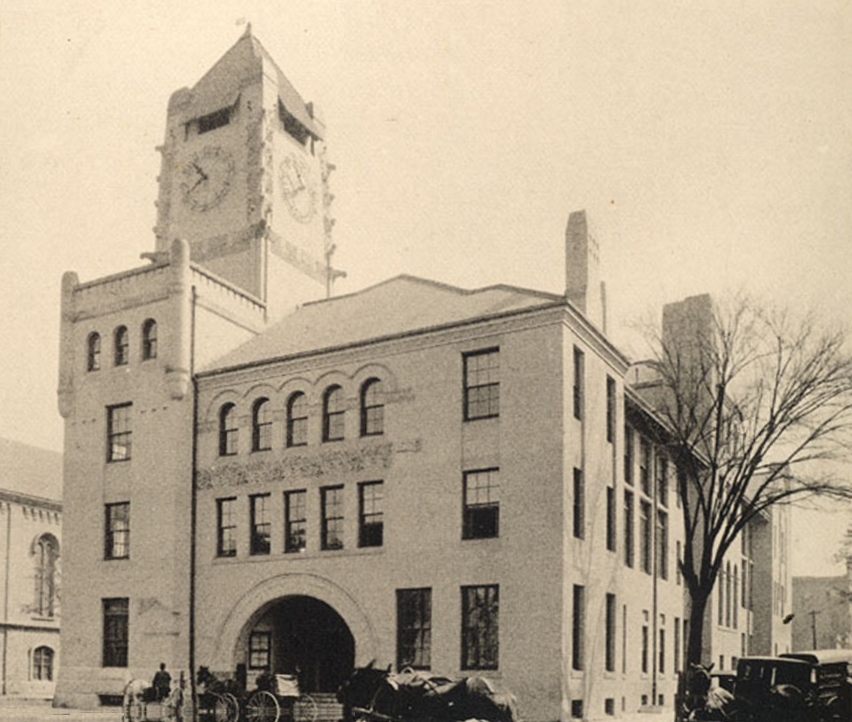
Chatham County Courthouse, 1889

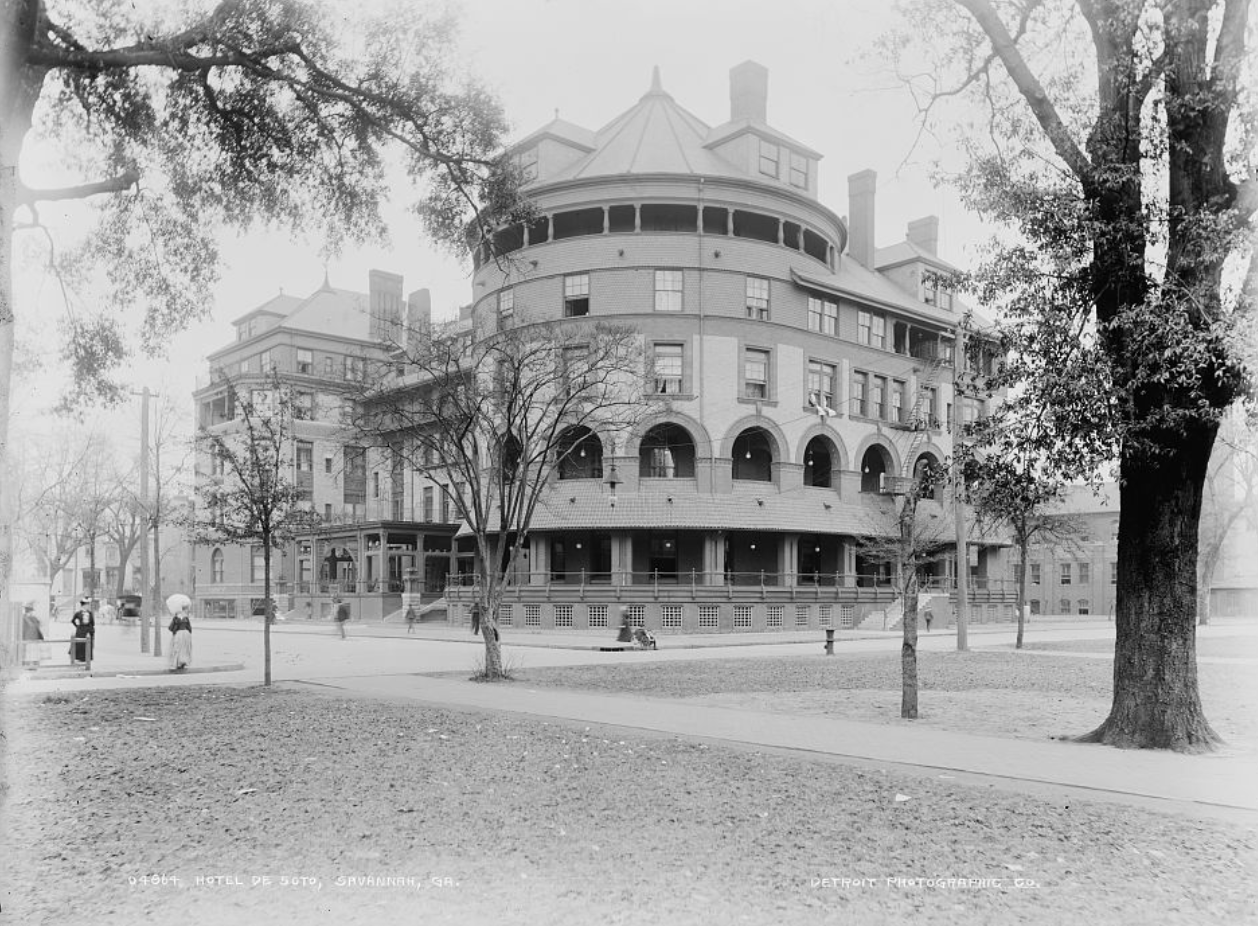
Hotel DeSoto, 1890

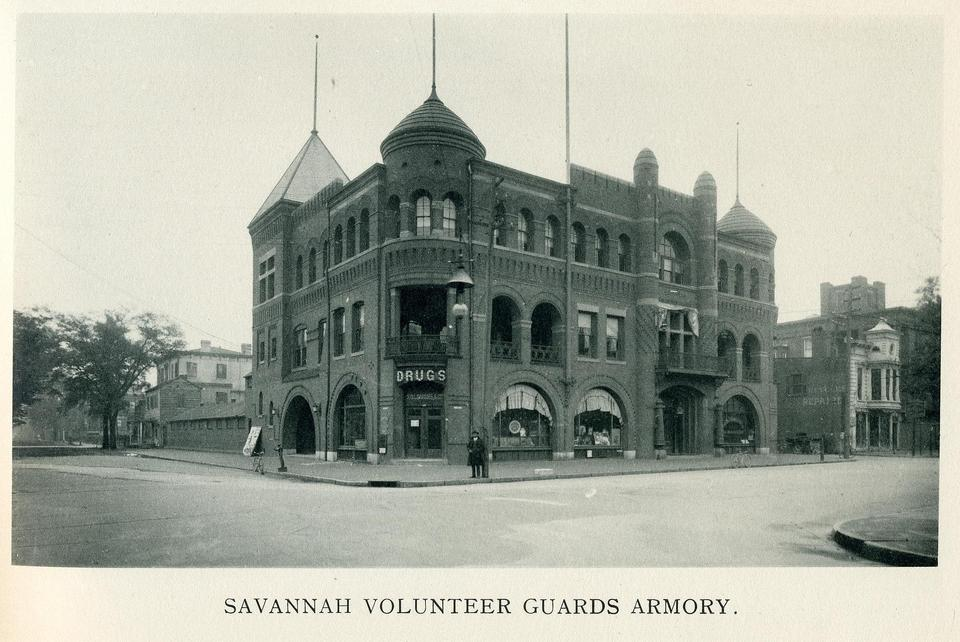
Savannah Volunteer Guards Armory, 1893
