= The DeSoto =

Hotel in Savannah, Georgia, US

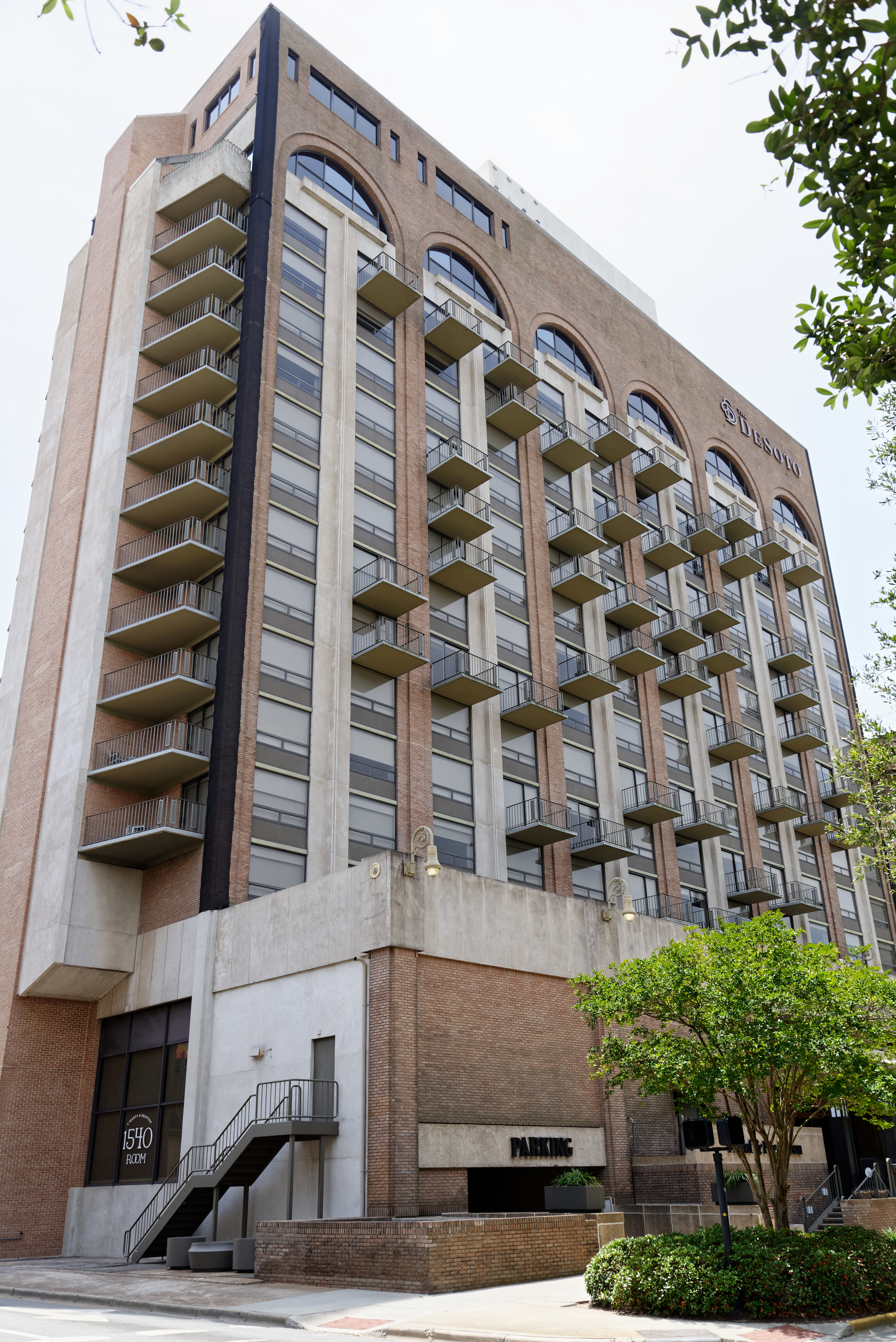
- The DeSoto in 2020

General information
- Location: Madison Square; Savannah, Georgia
- Coordinates: 32.0742°N 81.0931°W
- Owner: Sotherly Hotels
- Landlord: OTH Hotels & Resorts

The DeSoto is a historic hotel at 15 East Liberty Street on Madison Square in Savannah, Georgia, constructed in 1968. It is within the area of the Savannah Historic District, which was listed on the National Register of Historic Places in November 1966, although it is not specifically mentioned in the nomination form, because the current structure had not been built yet.

== History ==
=== First Hotel DeSoto ===
The original Hotel DeSoto was a 300-room resort, designed by William G. Preston and built in 1890. It closed in 1965 and was demolished.

First Hotel DeSoto
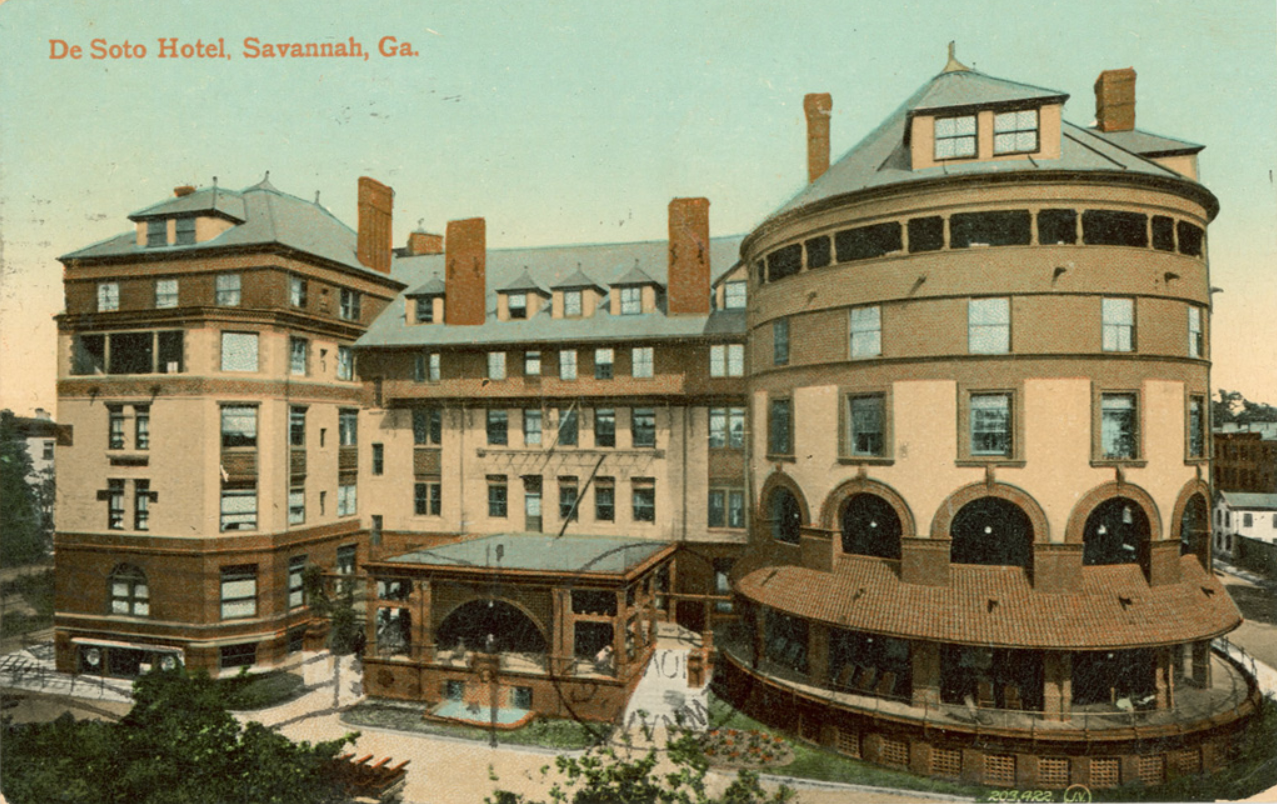
The first Hotel DeSoto, seen in 1909.

View in 1900

=== Modern Hotel DeSoto ===
The current structure was built on the site of the original hotel and opened in 1968 as the DeSoto Hilton. It underwent a $9.4 million renovation in 2017 and was renamed The DeSoto. It is a member of the Historic Hotels of America program, run by the National Trust for Historic Preservation.
