= O25 =

O25 may refer to:

- Douglas O-25, an observation aircraft of the United States Army Air Corps
- HNLMS O 25, a submarine of the Royal Netherlands Navy
- Obelisk (hieroglyph)
- Oxygen-25, an isotope of oxygen
