= Obelisk =

Tapered four-sided stone monument

Obelisk of queen Hatchepsut, standing about 29.5 to 30 metres (98 feet) tall and weighing approximately 323 metric tons (356 short tons), this 18th-Dynasty obelisk was placed between the 3rd and 4th pylons, Karnak, Luxor, Egypt

An obelisk (/ˈɒbəlɪsk/; from Ancient Greek ὀβελίσκος (obelískos), diminutive of ὀβελός (obelós) ' spit, nail, pointed pillar'), less often spelled obelisque, is a tapered, four-sided stone monument that is usually monolithic and has a pyramidal top. Originally constructed by the Egyptians and called tekhenu, the Greeks used the Greek term obeliskos to describe them, and this word passed into Latin and ultimately English. Though William Thomas used the term correctly in his Historie of Italie of 1549, by the late sixteenth century (after reduced contact with Italy following the excommunication of Queen Elizabeth), Shakespeare failed to distinguish between pyramids and obelisks in his plays and sonnets. Ancient obelisks are monolithic and consist of a single stone; most modern obelisks are made of several stones.

== Ancient obelisks ==
=== Egyptian ===
Obelisks were prominent in the architecture of the ancient Egyptians, and played a vital role in their religion placing them in pairs at the entrance of the temples. The word "obelisk" as used in English today is of Greek rather than Egyptian origin because Herodotus, the Greek traveler, was one of the first classical writers to describe the objects. A number of ancient Egyptian obelisks are known to have survived, plus the "unfinished obelisk" found partly hewn from its quarry at Aswan. These obelisks are now dispersed around the world, and fewer than half of them remain in Egypt.

The earliest temple obelisk still in its original position is the 68-foot (20.7 m) 120-metric-ton (130-short-ton) red granite Obelisk of Senusret I of the Twelfth Dynasty at Al-Matariyyah in modern Heliopolis.

In Egyptian mythology, the obelisk symbolized the sun god Ra, and during the religious reformation of Akhenaten it was said to have been a petrified ray of the Aten, the sundisk. Benben was the mound that arose from the primordial waters Nu upon which the creator god Atum settled in the creation story of the Heliopolitan creation myth form of Ancient Egyptian religion. The Benben stone (also known as a pyramidion) is the top stone of the Egyptian pyramid. It is also related to the obelisk.

Both New York University Egyptologist Patricia Blackwell Gary and Astronomy senior editor Richard Talcott hypothesize that the shapes of the ancient Egyptian pyramid and obelisk were derived from natural phenomena associated with the sun (the sun-god Ra being the Egyptians' greatest deity at that time). The pyramid and obelisk's significance have been previously overlooked, especially the astronomical phenomena connected with sunrise and sunset: Zodiacal light and sun pillars respectively.

Types of Egyptian obelisks

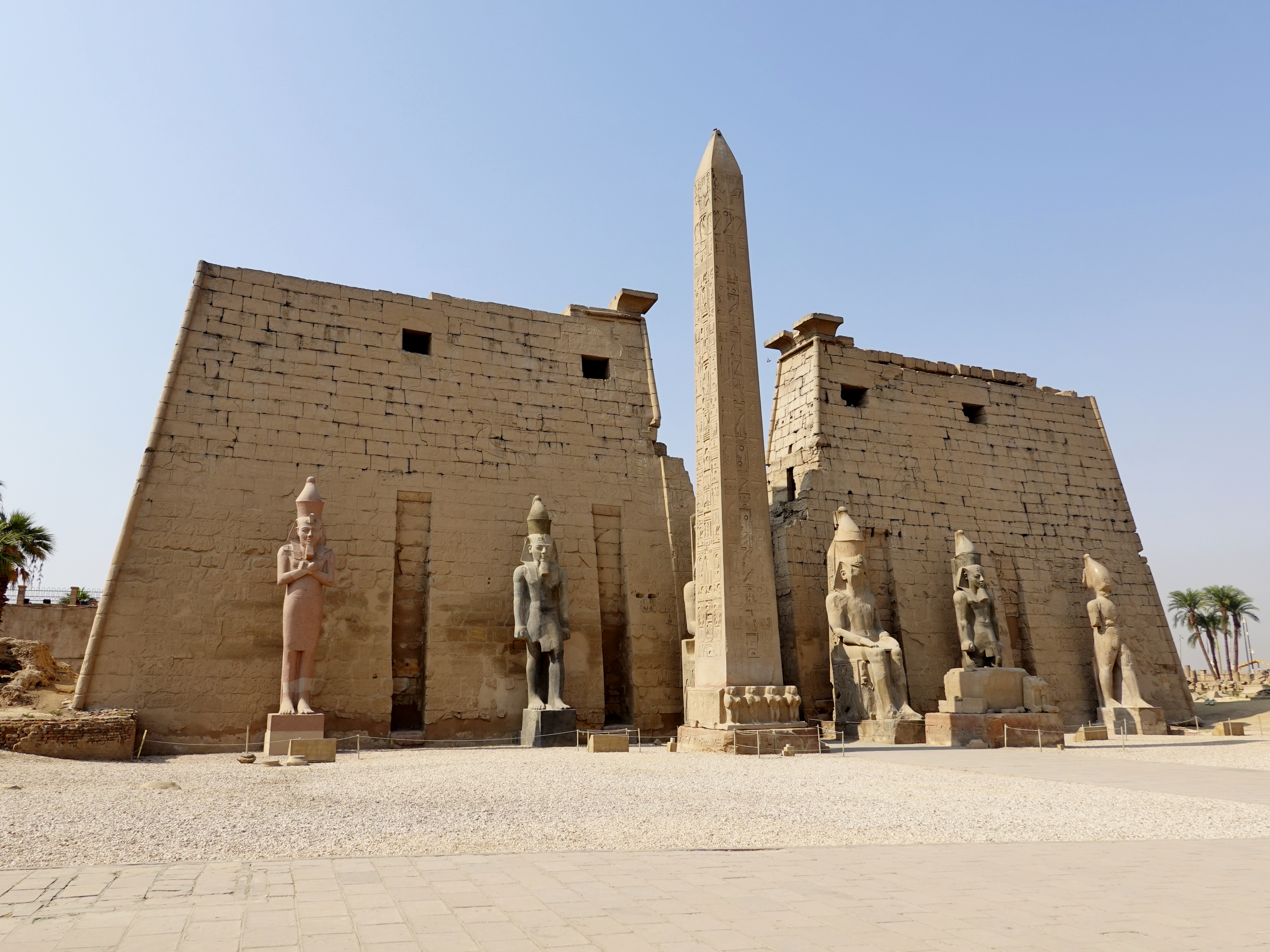
Pylon of the Temple of Luxor with the remaining Luxor Obelisk in front (the second is today on the Place de la Concorde in Paris)

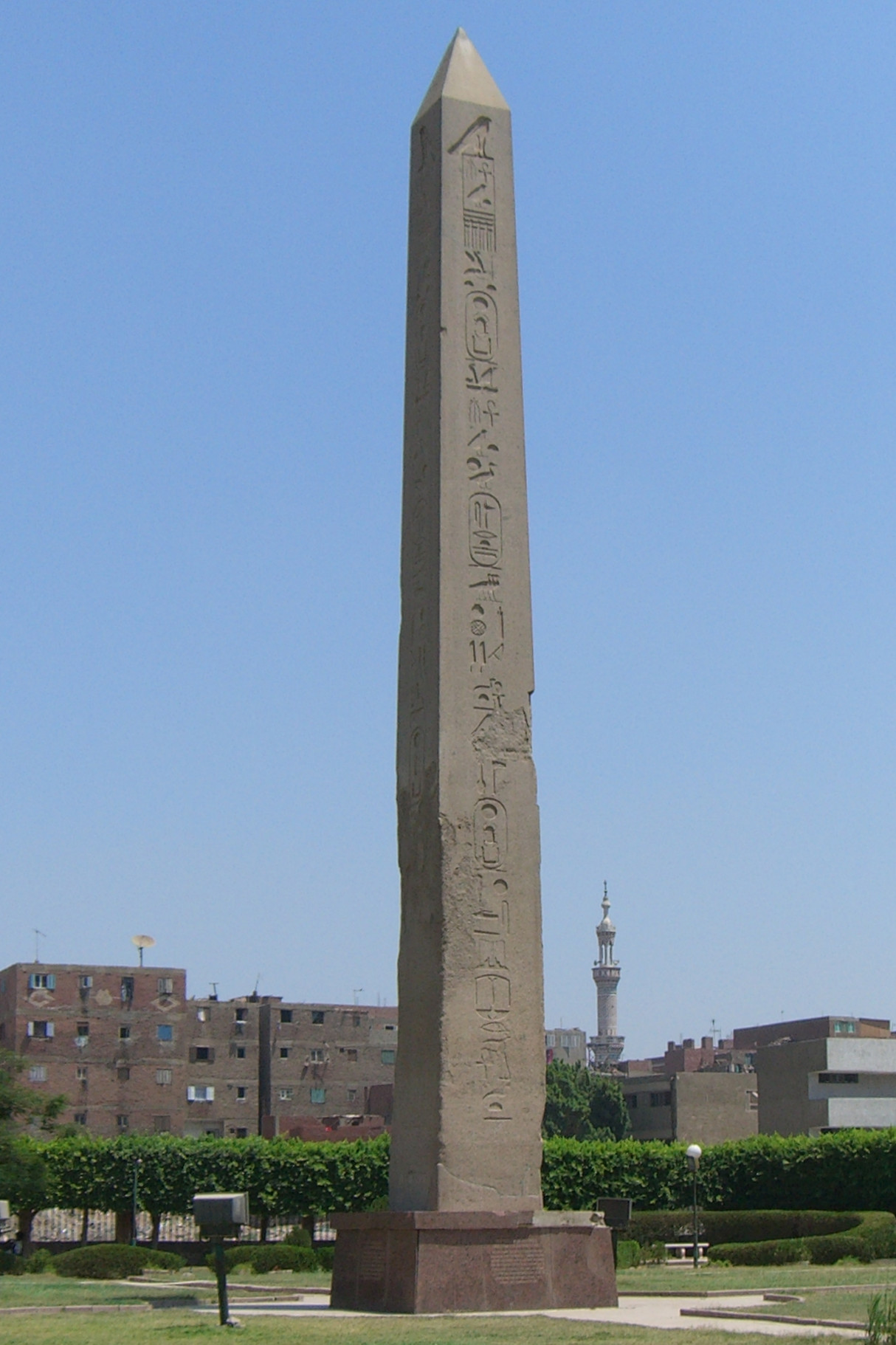
Obelisk of Pharaoh Senusret I, Al-Maalla area of Al-Matariyyah district in modern Heliopolis, Egypt

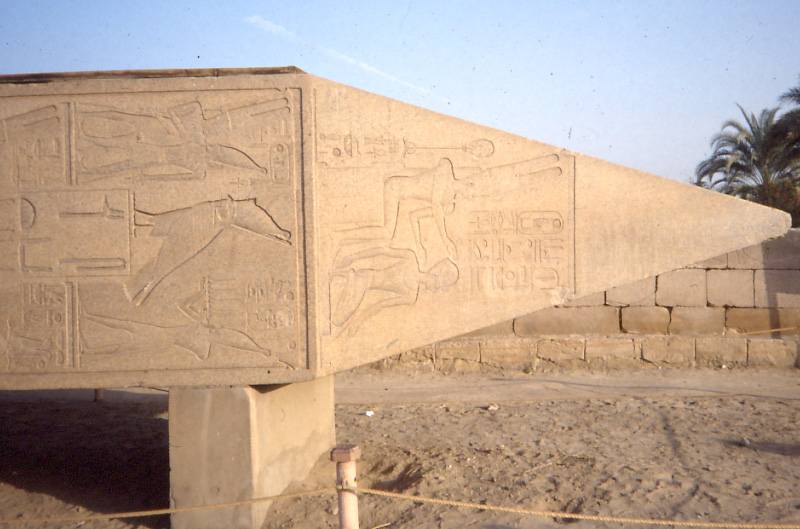
Tip of Hatshepsut's fallen obelisk, Karnak Temple Complex, Luxor, Egypt

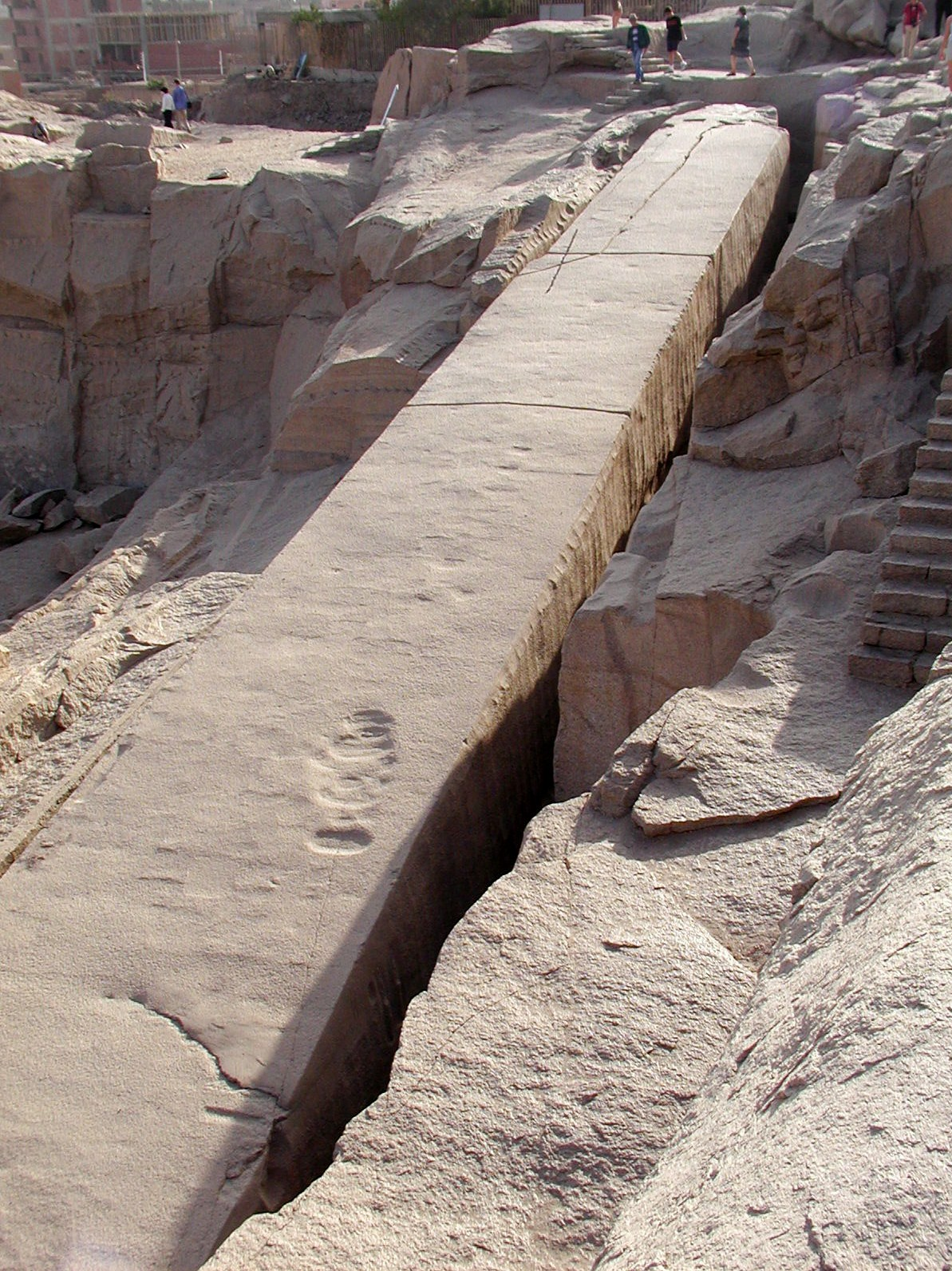
Unfinished obelisk, Aswan, Egypt

==== Nubian ====
Ancient Nubian kings of the twenty-fifth Dynasty sought to legitimize their rule over Egypt by constructing Egyptianizing monuments in the Middle Nile region. Historical sources mention that king Piye built at least one obelisk. The obelisk was made of local black granite and was found at the site of Kadakol. It had been cut down to make it into a column, presumably for one of the early Christian churches in the area of Old Dongola. Today the obelisk is exhibited in the National Museum in Khartoum. The obelisk is inscribed with the kings official titulary: Strong-bull, Appearing-in-Dominion (Thebes), King-of-Upper-and-Lower-Egypt, Two-ladies, Ruler-of-Egypt, Son-of-Rê, Pi(ankh)y: what he made as his monument for his father Amen-Rê, lord of [...].

An obelisk of King Senkamanisken was found at Gebel Barkal in 1916 by the Harvard University Museum of Fine Arts expedition to Sudan. There are remains of another small obelisk inscribed with the cartouche of King Aktisanes at the site of Gebel Barkal.

==== Ancient Egyptian obelisks in Ancient Rome ====
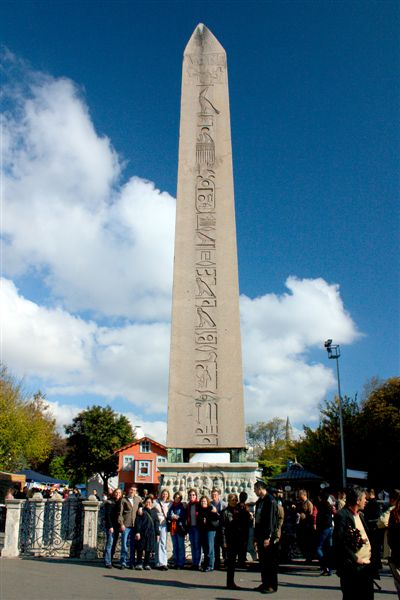
The Obelisk of Tuthmosis III, Istanbul, Turkey

Around 30 BCE, Rome seized control of Egypt and looted the various temple complexes; in one case they destroyed walls at the Temple of Karnak to haul them out. There are now more than twice as many obelisks that were seized and shipped out by Rome as remain in Egypt. The majority were dismantled during the Roman period over 1,700 years ago and the obelisks were sent to different locations.

The largest standing and tallest Egyptian obelisk is the Lateran Obelisk in the square at the west side of the Lateran Basilica in Rome at 105.6 feet (32.2 m) tall and a weight of 455 metric tons (502 short tons). More well known is the iconic 25 metres (82 ft), 331-metric-ton (365-short-ton) Vatican obelisk at Saint Peter's Square. Brought to Rome by the Emperor Caligula in 37 CE, it has stood at its current site and on the wall of the Circus of Nero, flanking St Peter's Basilica.

The elder Pliny in his Natural History refers to the obelisk's transportation from Egypt to Rome by order of the Emperor Gaius (Caligula) as an outstanding event. The barge that carried it had a huge mast of fir wood which four men's arms could not encircle. One hundred and twenty bushels of lentils were needed for ballast. Having fulfilled its purpose, the gigantic vessel was no longer wanted. Therefore, filled with stones and cement, it was sunk to form the foundations of the foremost quay of the new harbour at Ostia.

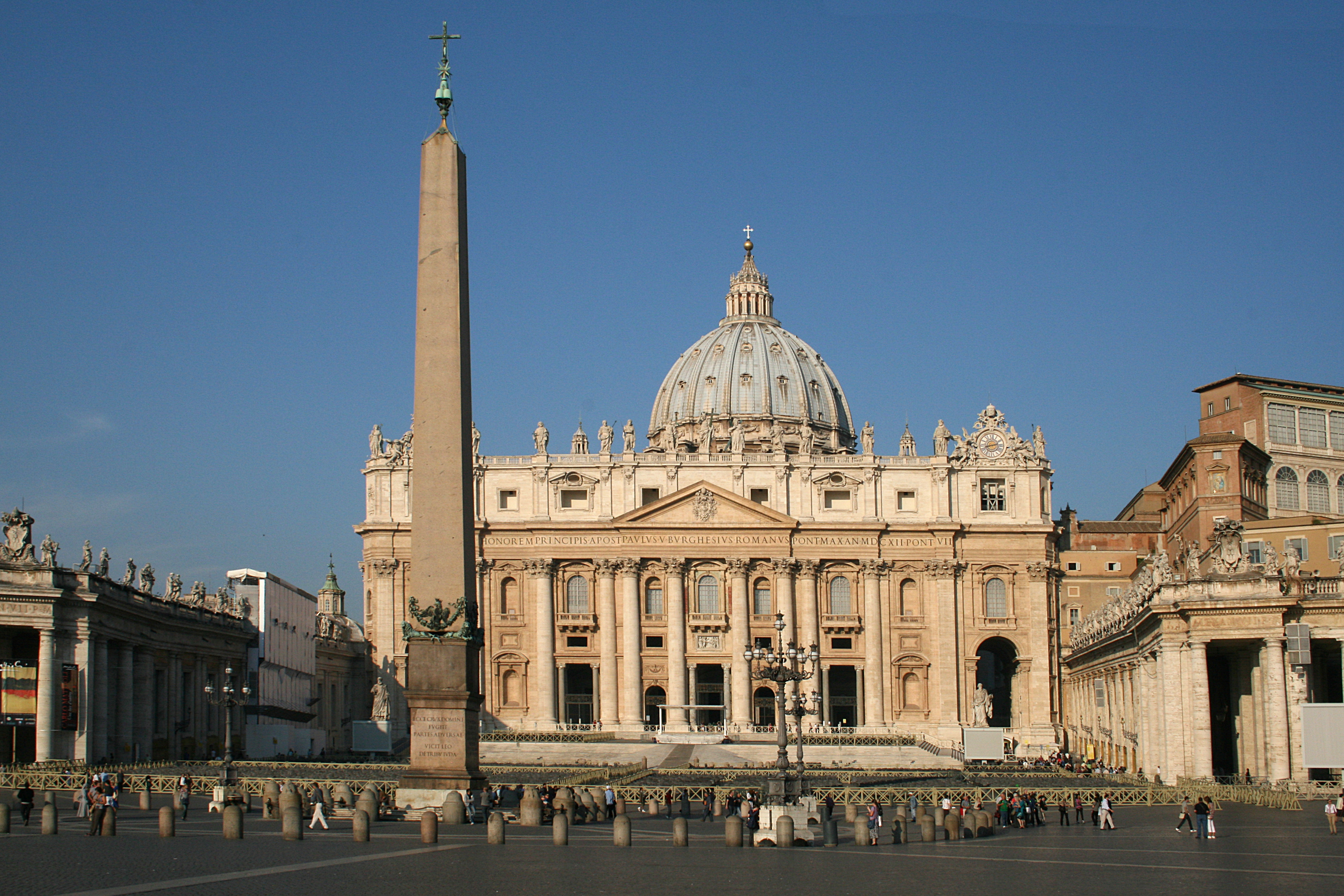
The Vatican obelisk in the center of St. Peter's Square, Vatican City.

Pope Sixtus V was determined to erect the obelisk in front of St Peter's, of which the nave was yet to be built. He had a full-sized wooden mock-up erected within months of his election. Domenico Fontana, the assistant of Giacomo Della Porta in the Basilica's construction, presented the Pope with a little model crane of wood and a heavy little obelisk of lead, which Sixtus himself was able to raise by turning a little winch with his finger. Fontana was given the project. Half-buried in the debris of the ages, it was first excavated as it stood; then it took from 30 April to 17 May 1586 to move it on rollers to the Piazza: it required nearly 1000 men, 140 carthorses, and 47 cranes. The re-erection, scheduled for 14 September, the Feast of the Exaltation of the Cross, was watched by a large crowd. It was a famous feat of engineering, which made the reputation of Fontana, who detailed it in a book illustrated with copperplate etchings, Della Trasportatione dell'Obelisco Vaticano et delle Fabriche di Nostro Signore Papa Sisto V (1590), which itself set a new standard in communicating technical information and influenced subsequent architectural publications by its meticulous precision. Before being re-erected the obelisk was exorcised. It is said that Fontana had teams of relay horses to make his getaway if the enterprise failed. When Carlo Maderno came to build the Basilica's nave, he had to put the slightest kink in its axis, to line it precisely with the obelisk.

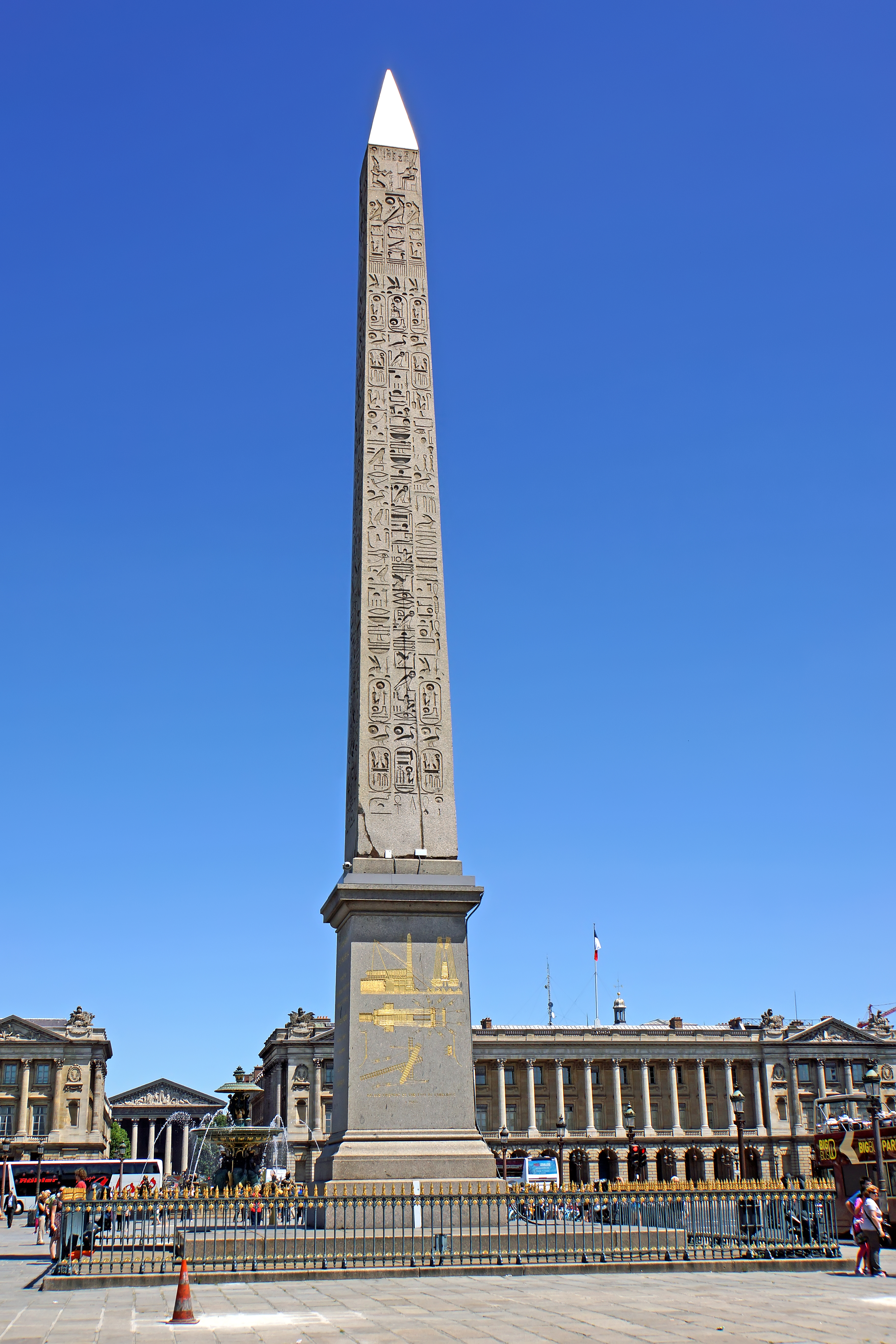
One of the two Luxor Obelisks, on the Place de la Concorde in Paris; a red granite monolithic column, 23 metres (75 feet) high, including the base, which weighs over 250 metric tons (280 short tons).

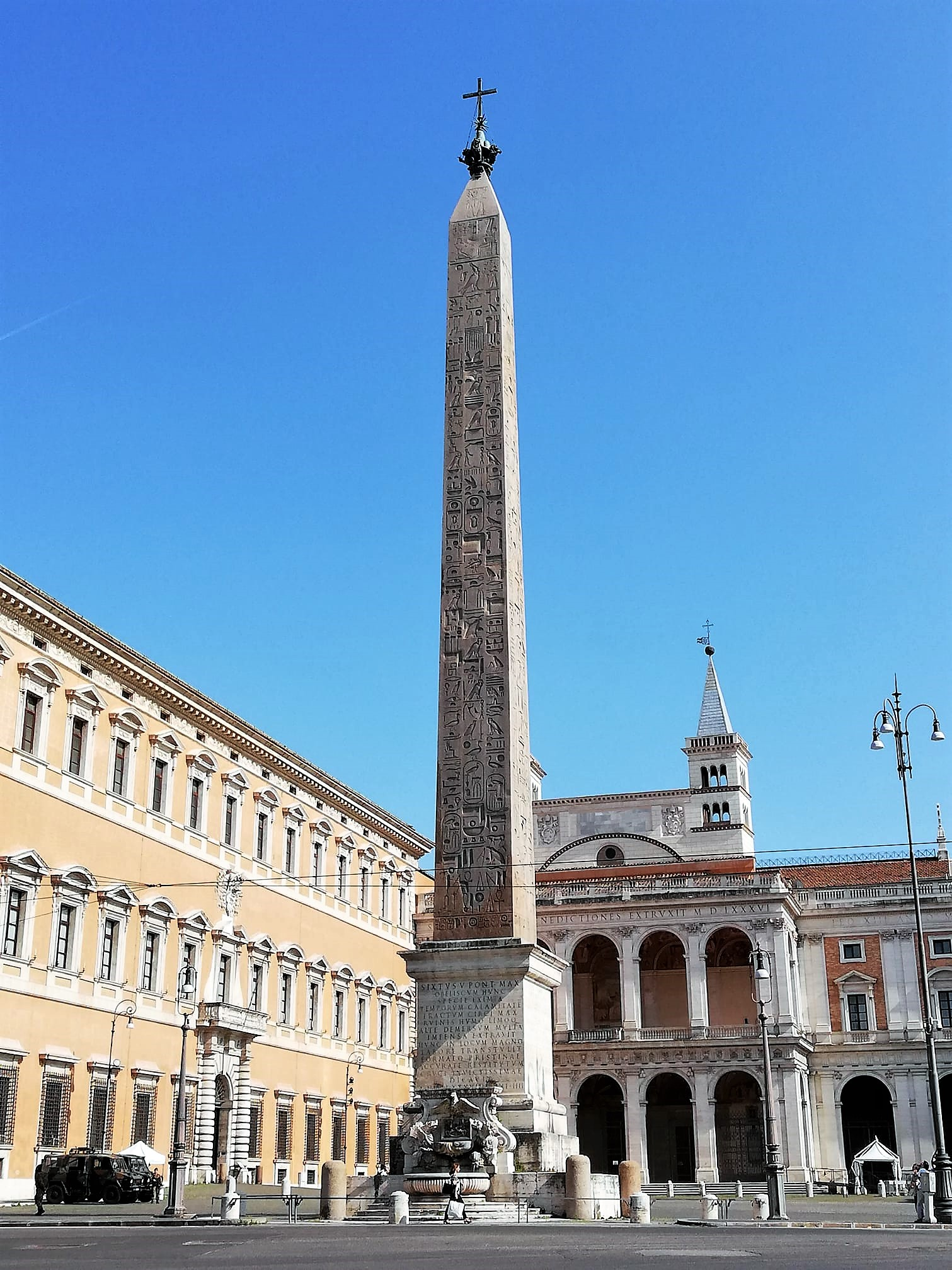
Lateran Obelisk in Piazza San Giovanni in Laterano, Rome. With its height of 32.18 metres (105.6 feet) (with the base and the cross it reaches 45.70 m) it is the largest standing ancient monolithic obelisk in the world.

Three more obelisks were erected in Rome under Sixtus V: at Santa Maria Maggiore, in 1587; at the Lateran Basilica, in 1588; and at the Piazza del Popolo, in 1589. An obelisk stands in front of the church of Trinità dei Monti, at the head of the Spanish Steps. Other notable Egyptian obelisks in Rome are found in Piazza della Minerva, sculpted while being carried on the back of an elephant, Piazza Montecitorio, Piazza della Rotonda, the Baths of Diocletian, and Villa Celimontana. Rome lost one of its obelisks, the Boboli obelisk which had decorated the temple of Isis, where it was uncovered in the 16th century. The Medici claimed it for the Villa Medici, but in 1790 they moved it to the Boboli Gardens attached to the Palazzo Pitti in Florence, and left a replica in its place.

Not all the Egyptian obelisks in the Roman Empire were set up at Rome: Herod the Great imitated his Roman patrons and set up an obelisk, Caesarea obelisk, made out of Egyptian red granite in the hippodrome of his new city Caesarea in northern Judea. This one is about 40 feet (12 m) tall and weighs about 100 metric tons (110 short tons). It was discovered by archaeologists and has been re-erected at its former site.

In 357 CE, Emperor Constantius II had two Karnak Temple obelisks removed and transported down the Nile to Alexandria to commemorate his ventennalia, the 20th year of his reign. Afterward, one was sent to Rome and erected on the spina of the Circus Maximus, and is today known as the Lateran Obelisk. The other one, known as the Obelisk of Theodosius, remained in Alexandria until 390 CE, when Emperor Theodosius I had it transported to Constantinople (now Istanbul) and put up on the spina of the Hippodrome of Constantinople (now Sultan Ahmet Square). It once stood 95 feet (29 m) tall and weighed 380 metric tons (420 short tons); however, its lower section (which reputedly also once stood in the hippodrome) is now lost, reducing the obelisk's size to 65 feet (20 m).

==== Ancient Egyptian obelisks in modern cities ====
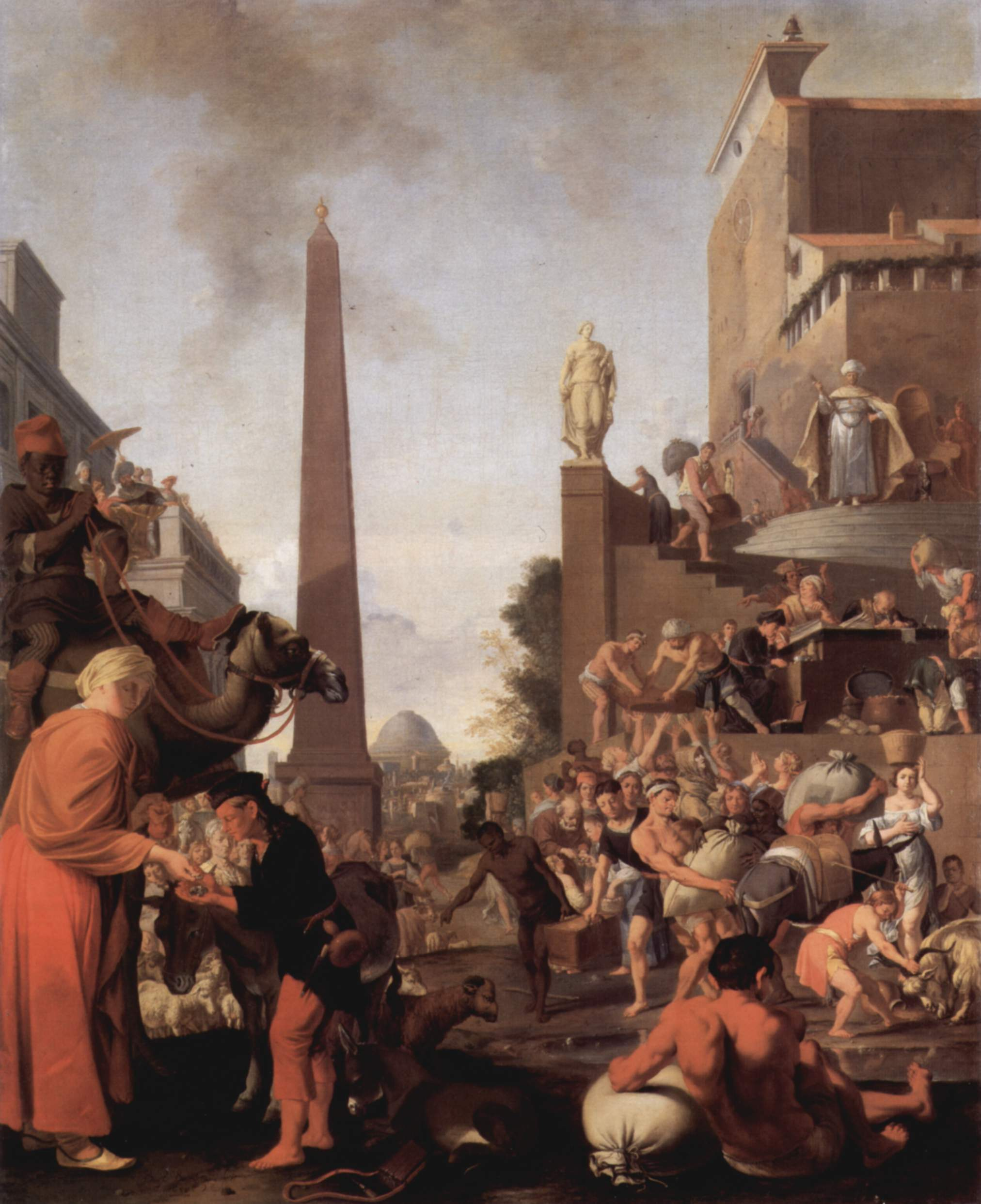
The Dutch Golden Age painter Bartholomeus Breenbergh placed an obelisk in the background of his 1655 painting Joseph Sells Grain

The Ancient Romans populated their city with 8 large and 42 small Egyptian obelisks. More have been re-erected elsewhere, and the best-known examples outside Rome are the pair of 21-metre (69 ft) 187-metric-ton (206-short-ton) Cleopatra's Needles in London, England (21 metres or 69 feet), and New York City, US (21 metres or 70 feet), and the 23-metre (75 ft) over-250-metric-ton (280-short-ton) Luxor Obelisk at the Place de la Concorde in Paris, France.

Obelisks were being shipped out of Egypt as late as the nineteenth century when three of them were sent to London, New York and Paris. Their transportation was covered by various newspapers.

=== Assyrian ===
Obelisk monuments are also known from the Assyrian civilization, where they were erected as public monuments that commemorated the achievements of the Assyrian king.

The British Museum possesses four Assyrian obelisks:

The White Obelisk of Ashurnasirpal I (named due to its colour), was discovered by Hormuzd Rassam in 1853 at Nineveh. The obelisk was erected by either Ashurnasirpal I (1050–1031 BCE) or Ashurnasirpal II (883–859 BCE). The obelisk bears an inscription that refers to the king's seizure of goods, people and herds, which he carried back to the city of Ashur. The reliefs of the Obelisk depict military campaigns, hunting, victory banquets and scenes of tribute bearing.

The Rassam Obelisk, named after its discoverer Hormuzd Rassam, was found on the citadel of Nimrud (ancient Kalhu). It was erected by Ashurnasirpal II, though only survives in fragments. The surviving parts of the reliefs depict scenes of tribute bearing to the king from Syria and the west.

The Black Obelisk was discovered by Sir Austen Henry Layard in 1846 on the citadel of Kalhu. The obelisk was erected by Shalmaneser III and the reliefs depict scenes of tribute bearing as well as the depiction of two subdued rulers, Jehu the Israelite, and Sua the Gilzanean, making gestures of submission to the king. The reliefs on the obelisk have accompanying epigraphs, but besides these the obelisk also possesses a longer inscription that records one of the latest versions of Shalmaneser III's annals, covering the period from his accessional year to his 33rd regnal year.

The Broken Obelisk, that was also discovered by Rassam at Nineveh. Only the top of this monolith has been reconstructed in the British Museum. The obelisk is the oldest recorded obelisk from Assyria, dating to the 11th century BCE.

=== Ancient Roman ===
The Romans commissioned obelisks in an ancient Egyptian style. Examples include:

- Arles, France – Arles Obelisk, in Place de la République, a 4th-century obelisk of Roman origin
- Benevento, Italy – Domitian Obelisk
- Munich, Naples and Palestrina – Titus Sextius Africanus obelisks, Staatliches Museum Ägyptischer Kunst, Naples Archaeological Museum Museo archeologico nazionale di Palestrina, 1st century AD, 5.80 m
- Rome – there are five, see List of obelisks in Rome

=== Byzantine ===
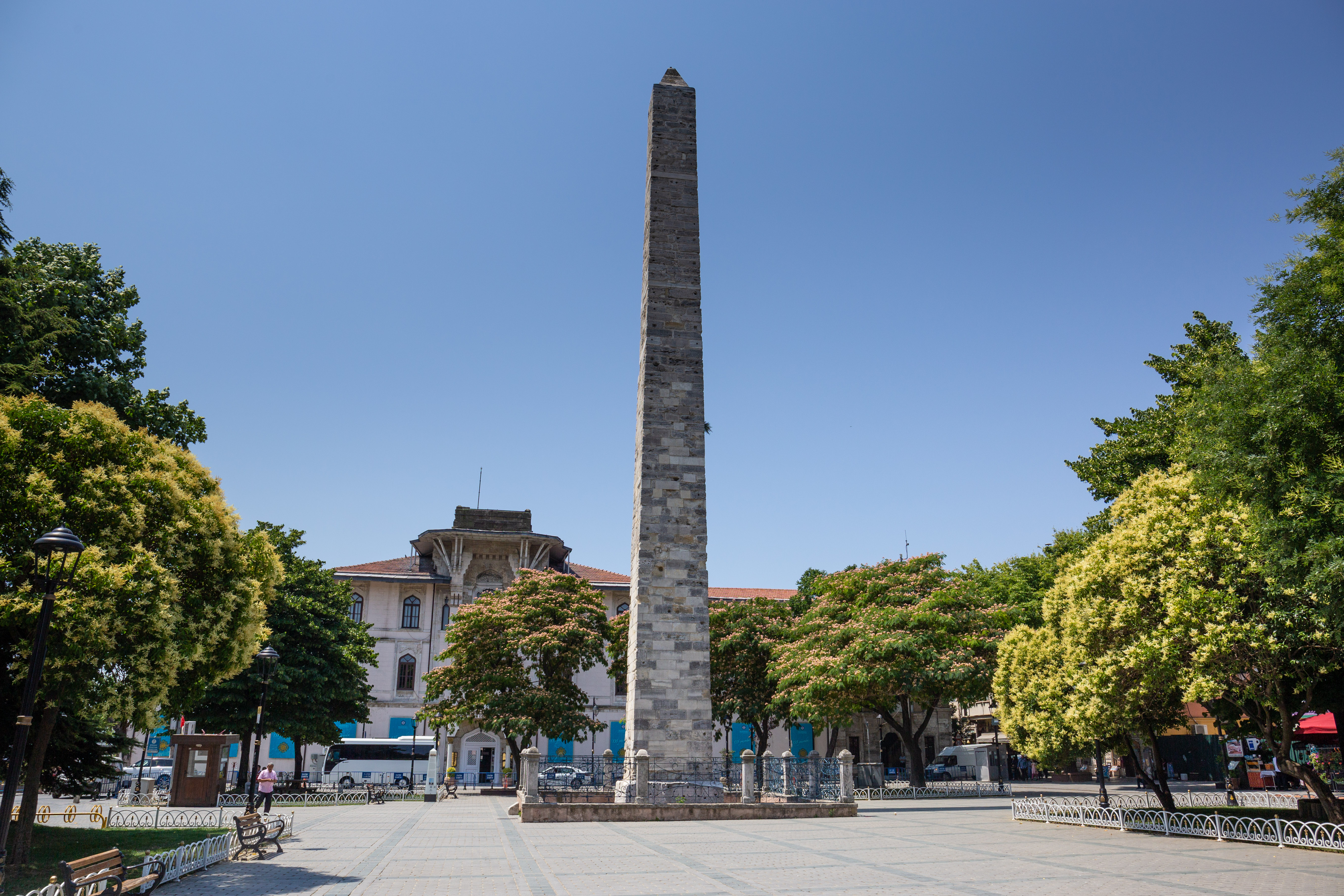
The Walled Obelisk in Istanbul, Turkey

- Istanbul, Turkey – Walled Obelisk, at Hippodrome of Constantinople (now Sultan Ahmet Square), built by Constantine VII Porphyrogenitus (905–959) and originally covered with gilded bronze plaques

=== Pre-Columbian ===
The prehistoric Tello Obelisk, found in 1919 at Chavín de Huantar in Peru, is a monolith stele with obelisk-like proportions. It is 2.52 metres tall and was carved in a design of low relief with Chavín symbols, such as bands of teeth and animal heads. Long housed in the Museo Nacional de Arqueología, Antropología e Historia del Perú in Lima, it was relocated to the Museo Nacional de Chavín, which opened in July 2008. The obelisk was named for the archaeologist Julio C. Tello, who discovered it and was considered the 'father of Peruvian archaeology'. He was America's first indigenous archaeologist.

== Modern obelisks ==
=== As commemorative monuments ===
Egyptian obelisks remain a source of fascination, serving as a reminder of past glories and a symbol of state power. A majority of modern obelisks are built of masonry or concrete, so not monolithic like their Egyptian counterparts, and are often oversized. Examples from the 19th and 20th centuries include the Obelisk (1800) in Stockholm, Stone of the Empress (1835) in Helsinki, the Wellington Monument (1861) in Dublin, the Washington Monument (1884) in Washington, D.C., the Obelisk of Buenos Aires (1936) in Buenos Aires, the Obelisk of São Paulo (1947) in São Paulo, the Monument to the People's Heroes (1958) in Tiananmen Square, Beijing and the National Monument (1975) in Jakarta. A few, however, continue the ancient tradition of the monolithic obelisk.

Modern obelisks

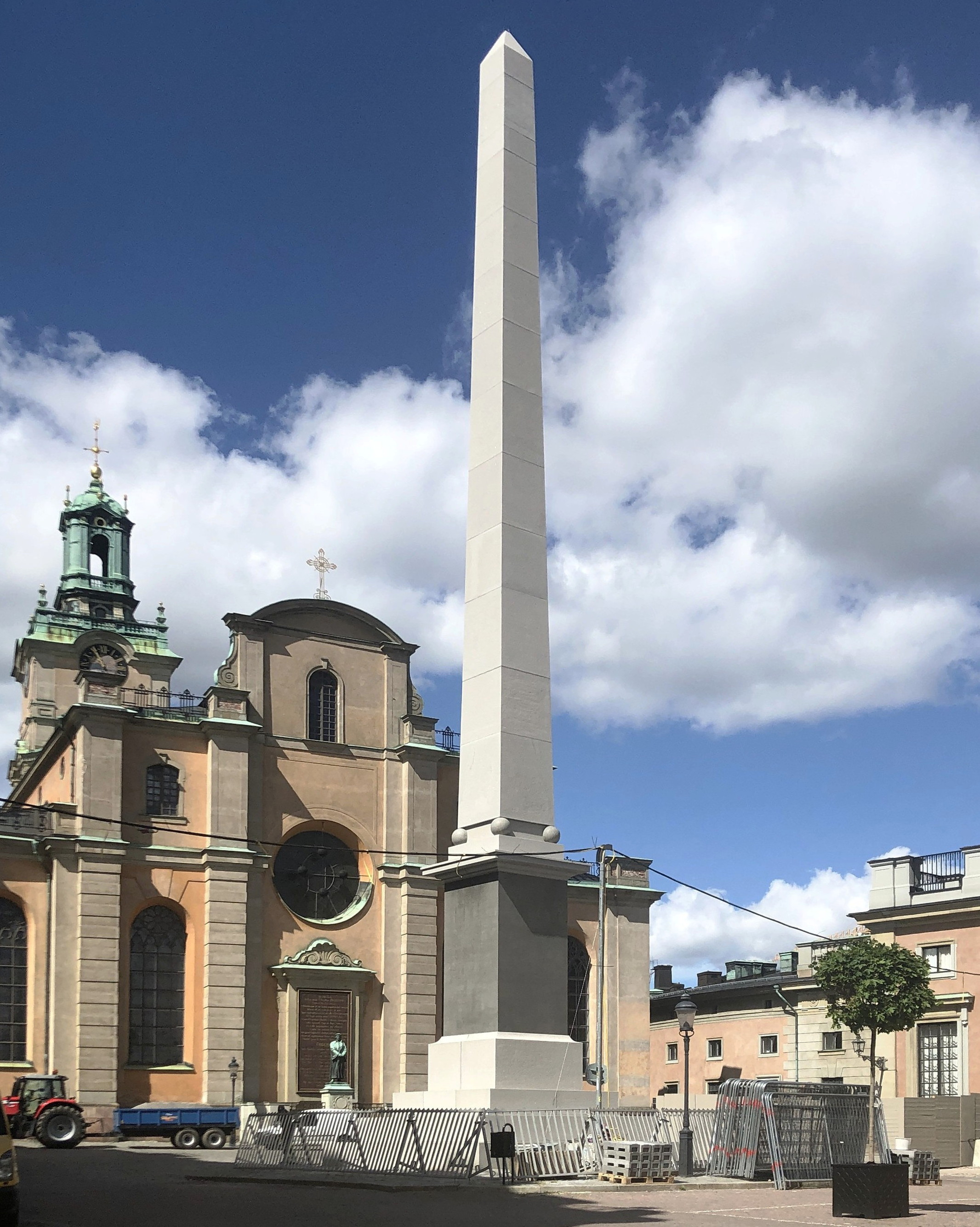
Obelisk in Stockholm raised in the year 1800 as a memorial to the service and dedication of the Stockholm burghers during the Russo-Swedish war 1788-1790.

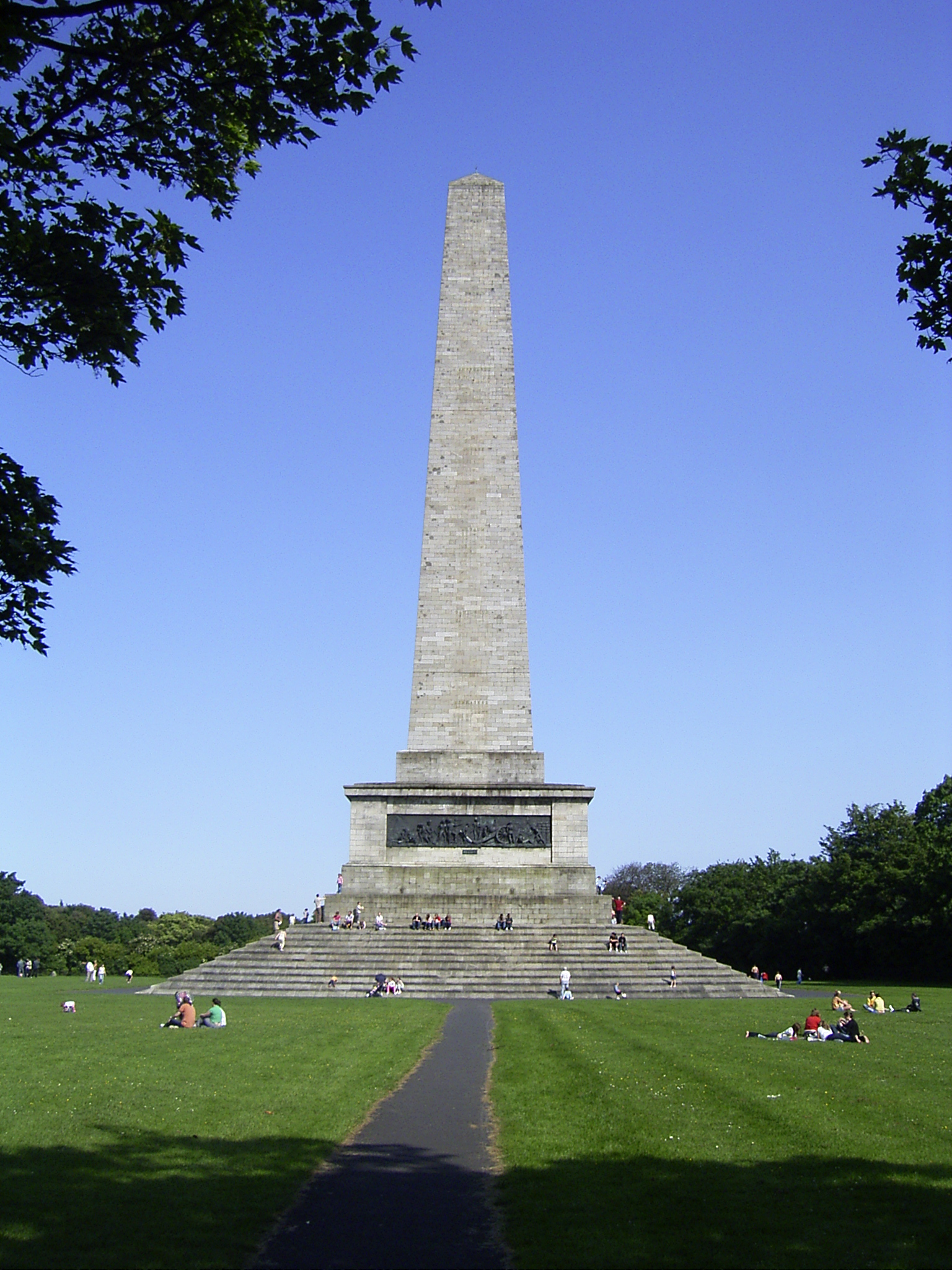
The Wellington Monument in Dublin, Ireland, built between 1817 and 1861 to commemorate the victories of Arthur Wellesley, 1st Duke of Wellington

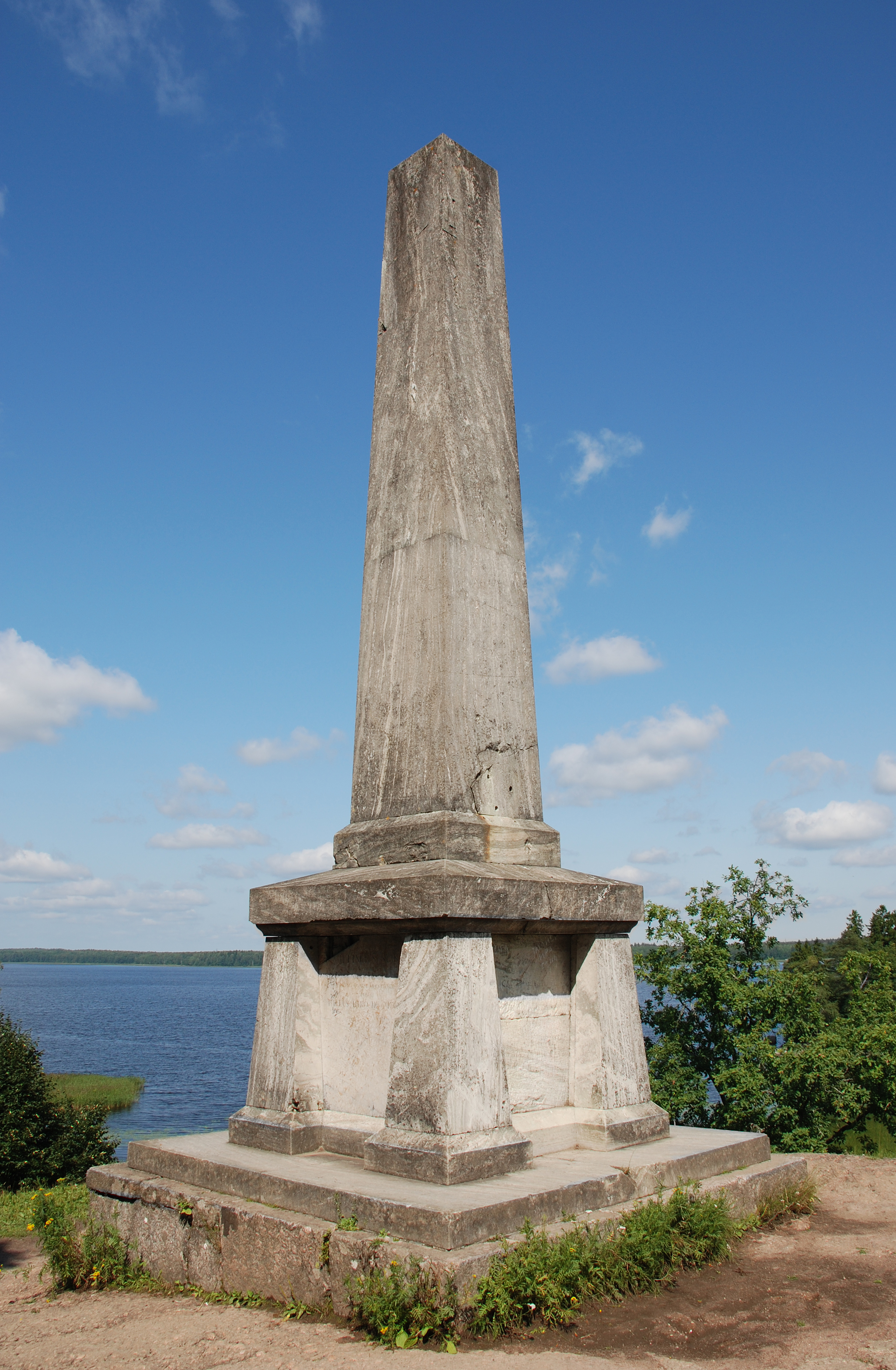
The Brothers Broglie Obelisk at the Monrepos Park in Vyborg, Russia, erected in 1827

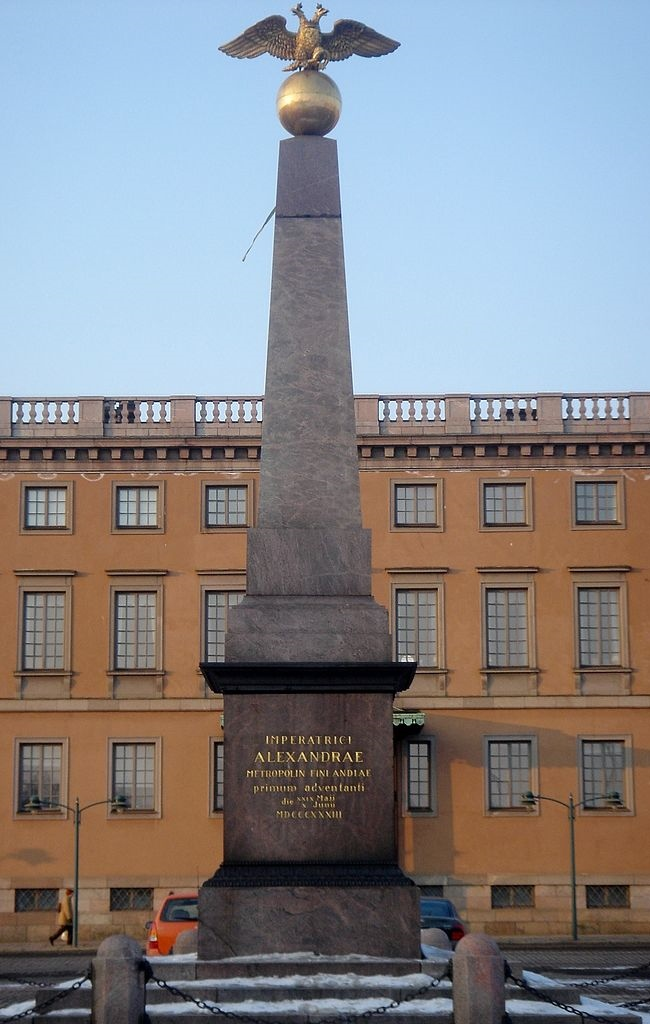
The Stone of the Empress by Carl Ludvig Engel, erected in 1835 to commemorate Empress Alexandra Feodorovna of Russia, at the Market Square in Helsinki, Finland

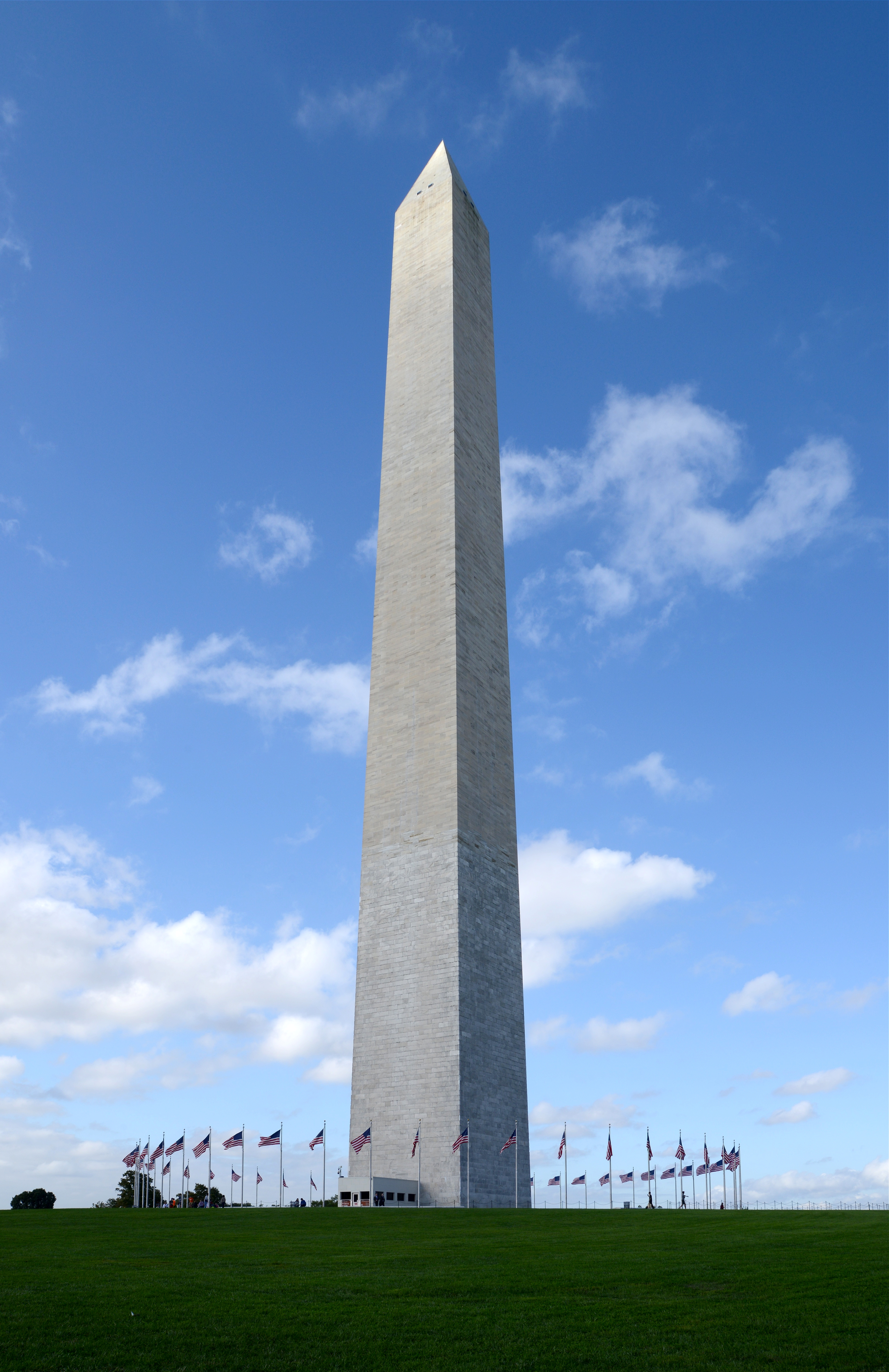
The Washington Monument in Washington, D.C., U.S., built between 1848 and 1884 to commemorate George Washington

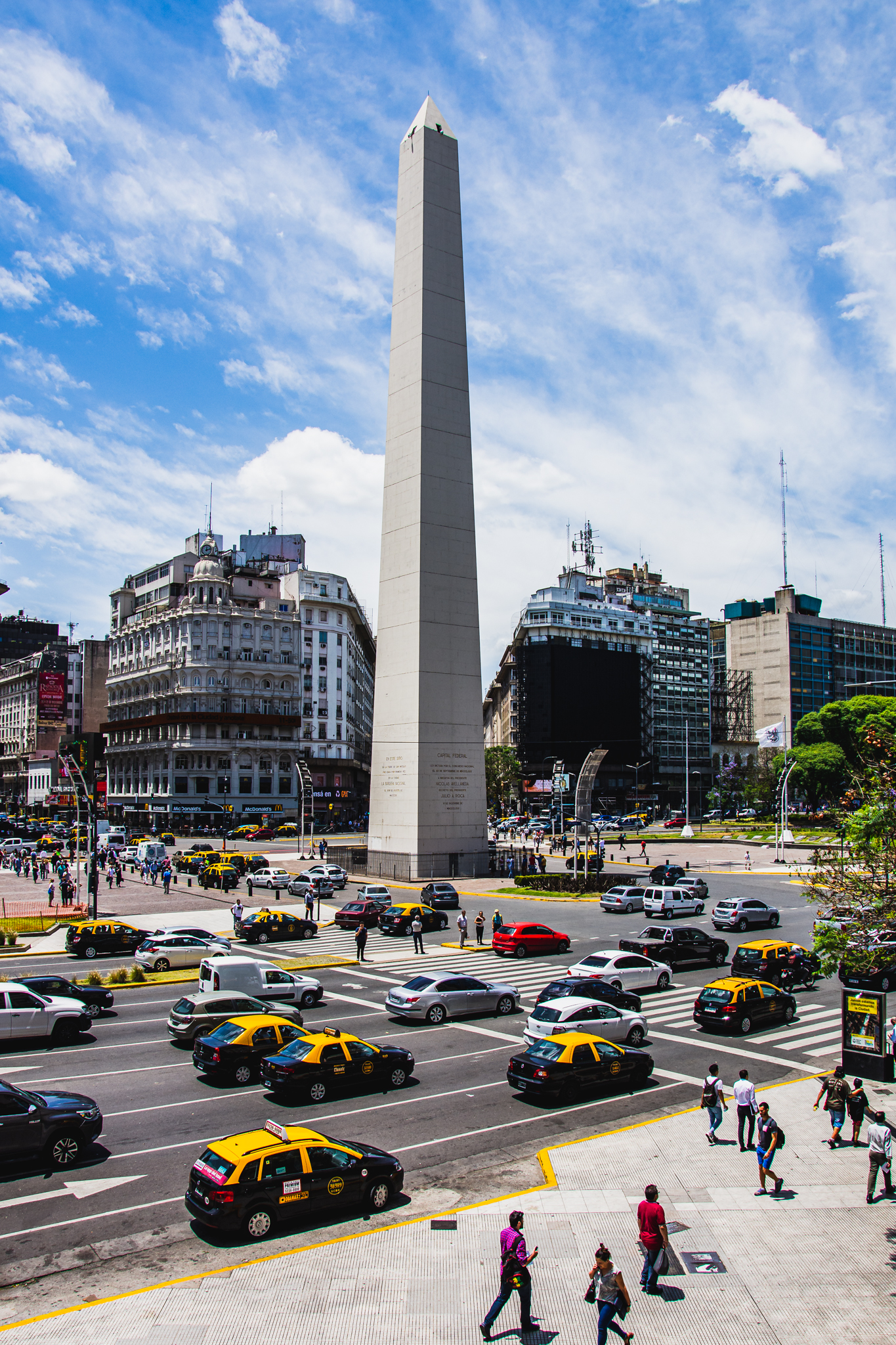
The Obelisk of Buenos Aires, Argentina, erected in 1936 to commemorate the quadricentennial of the foundation of the city

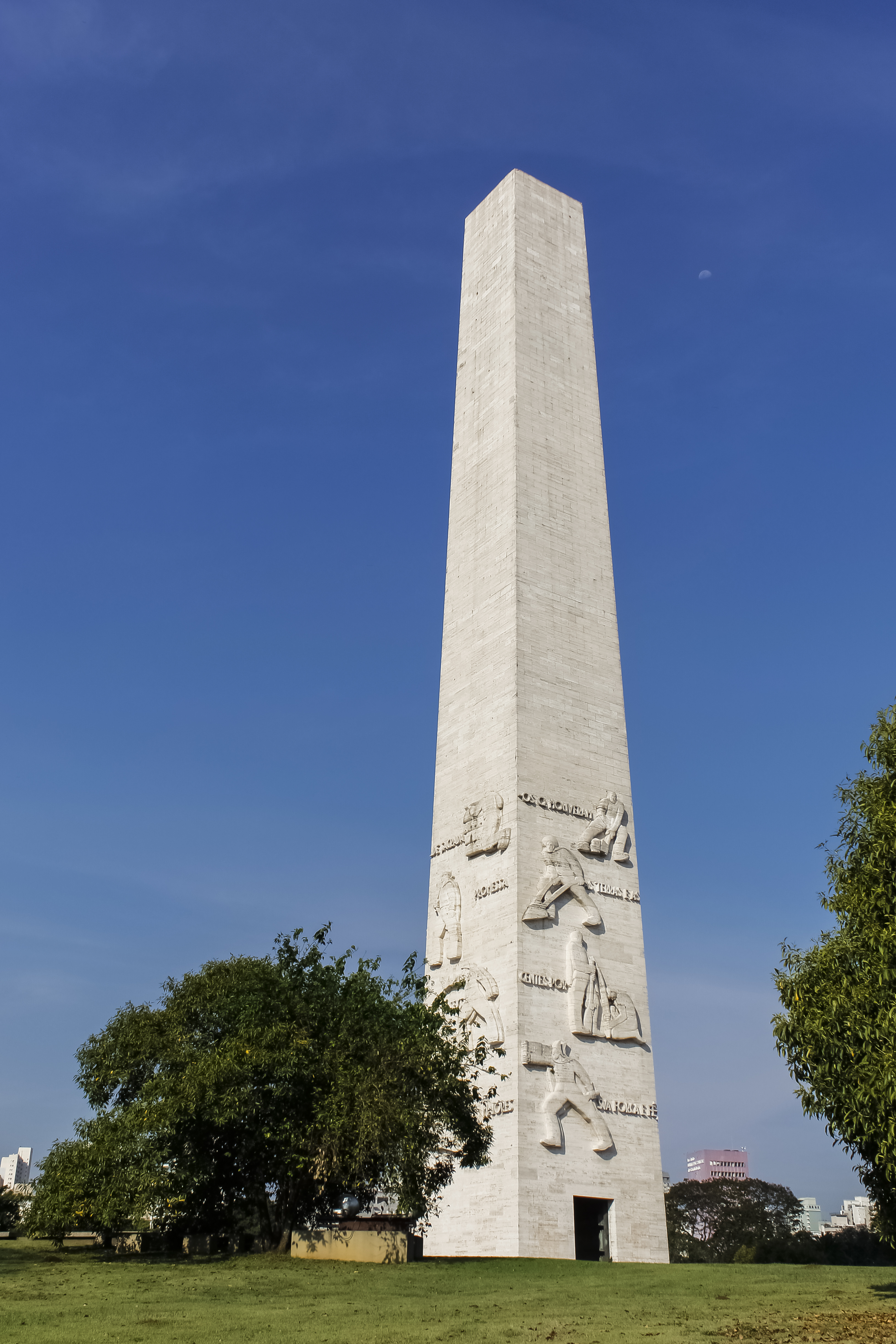
The Obelisk of São Paulo, Brazil, built in 1947 to honor the dead of the Constitutionalist Revolution of 1932

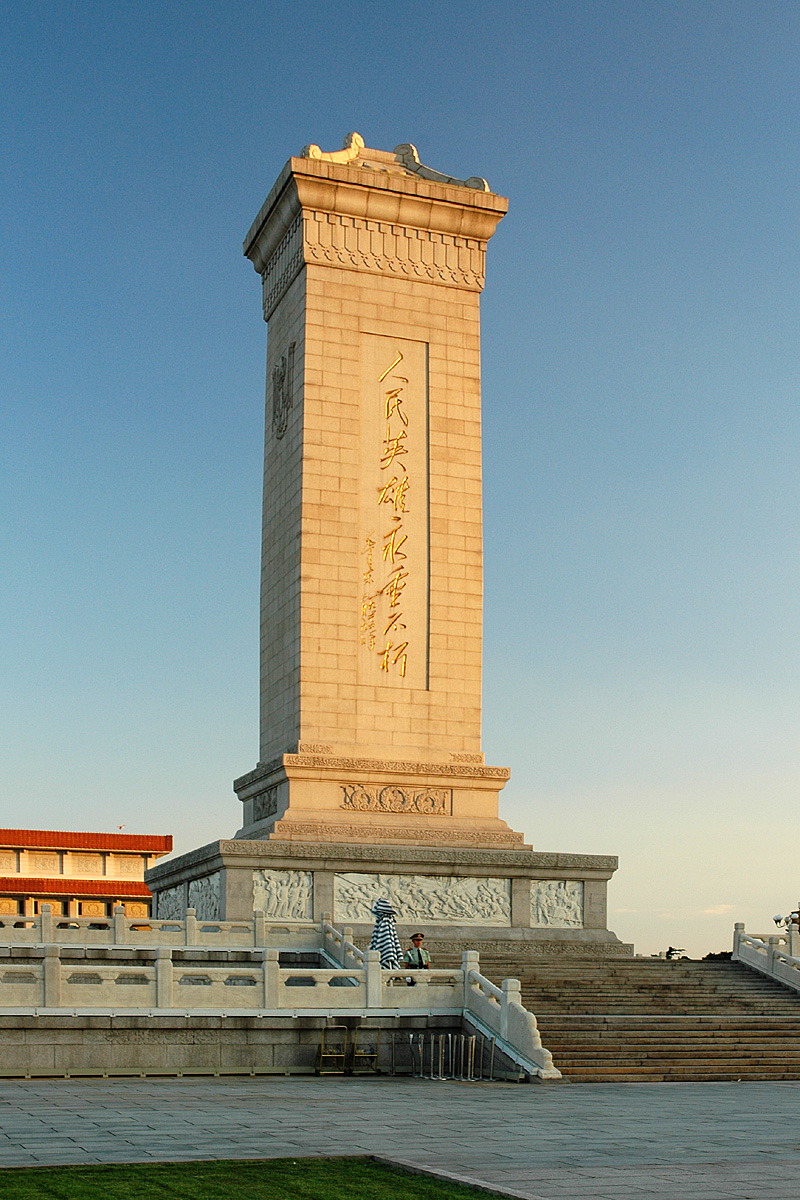
The Monument to the People's Heroes in Tiananmen Square, Beijing, China, built between 1952 and 1958 to commemorate the martyrs of revolutionary struggle in the 19th and 20th centuries

The National Monument in Jakarta, Indonesia, built between 1961 and 1975 to commemorate the struggle for Indonesian independence

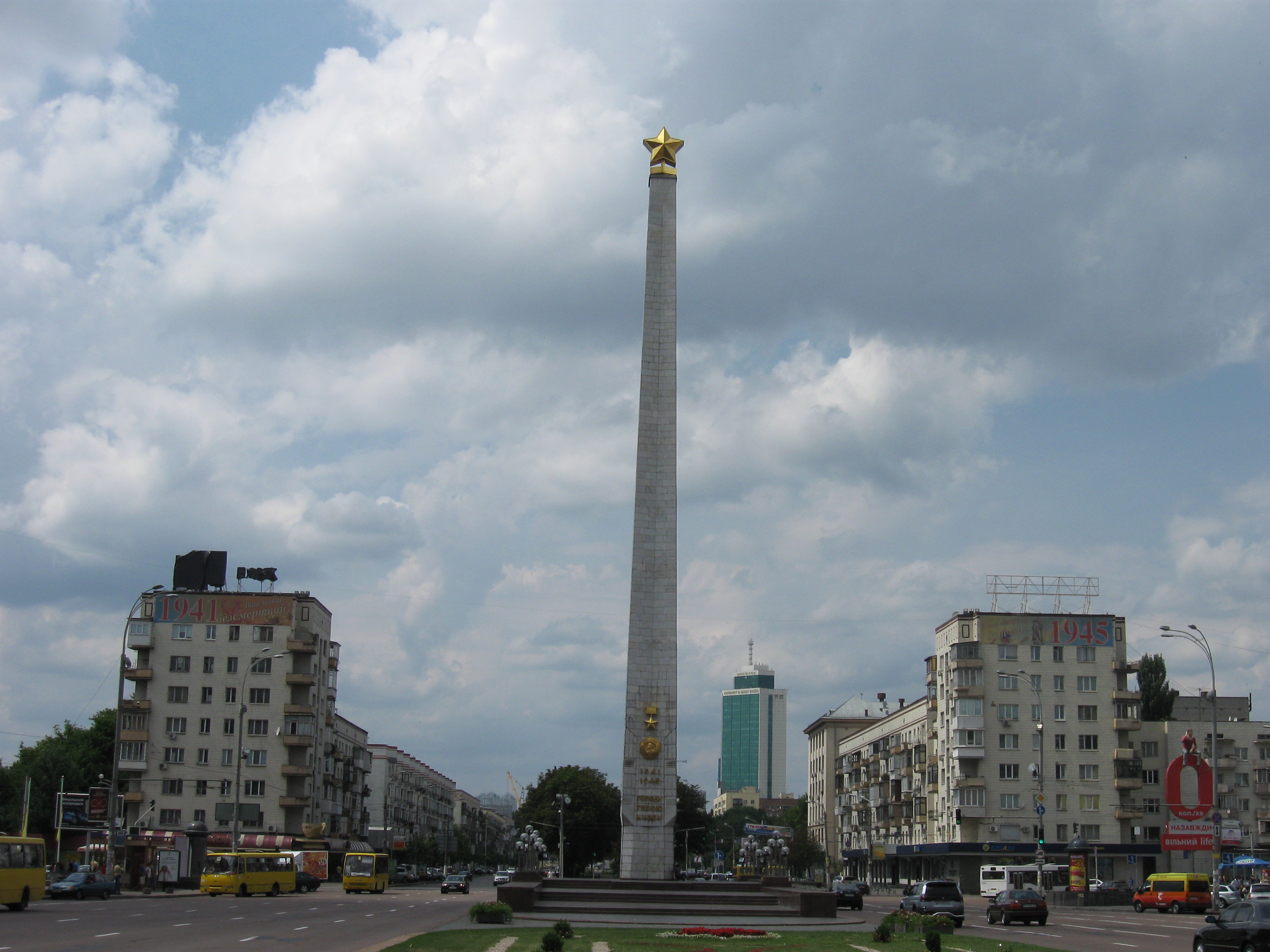
Hero City monument, Kyiv, Ukraine, installed in 1982 as a tribute to the fallen in World War II

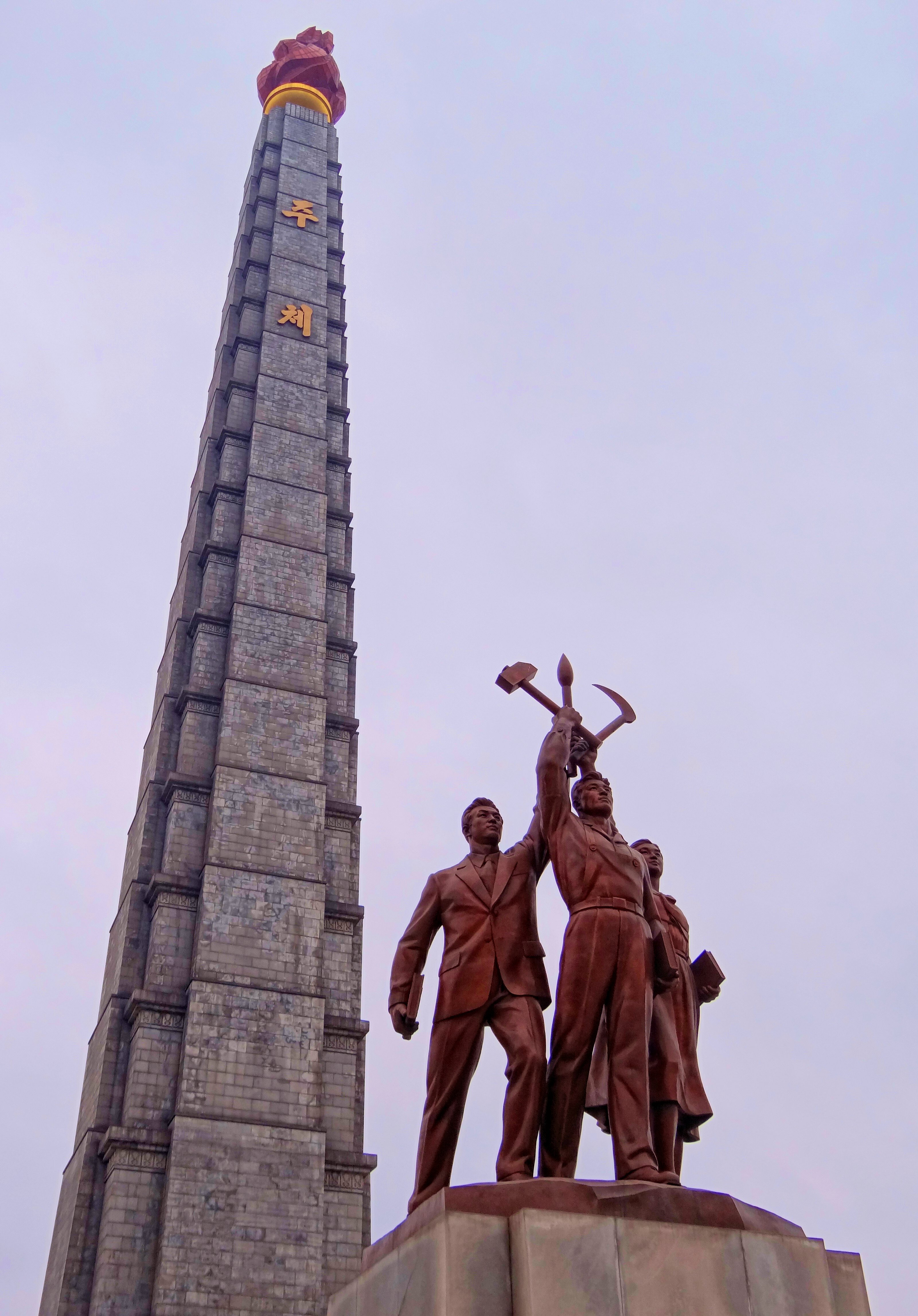
The Juche Tower in Pyongyang, North Korea, completed in 1982 to commemorate the 70th birthday of Kim Il Sung and the ideology of Juche

=== Other usages ===
In Rome, the Via della Conciliazione, cleared in 1936–1950 to link Saint Peter's Basilica to the centre of the capital is lined with obelisks serving as lampposts.

In France and other European countries, monuments to the dead, such as headstones and grave markers, were very often given a form of obelisks, but they are of more modest size. The practice is also still widespread in the Islamic world.

Modern obelisks have also been used in surveying as boundary markers.

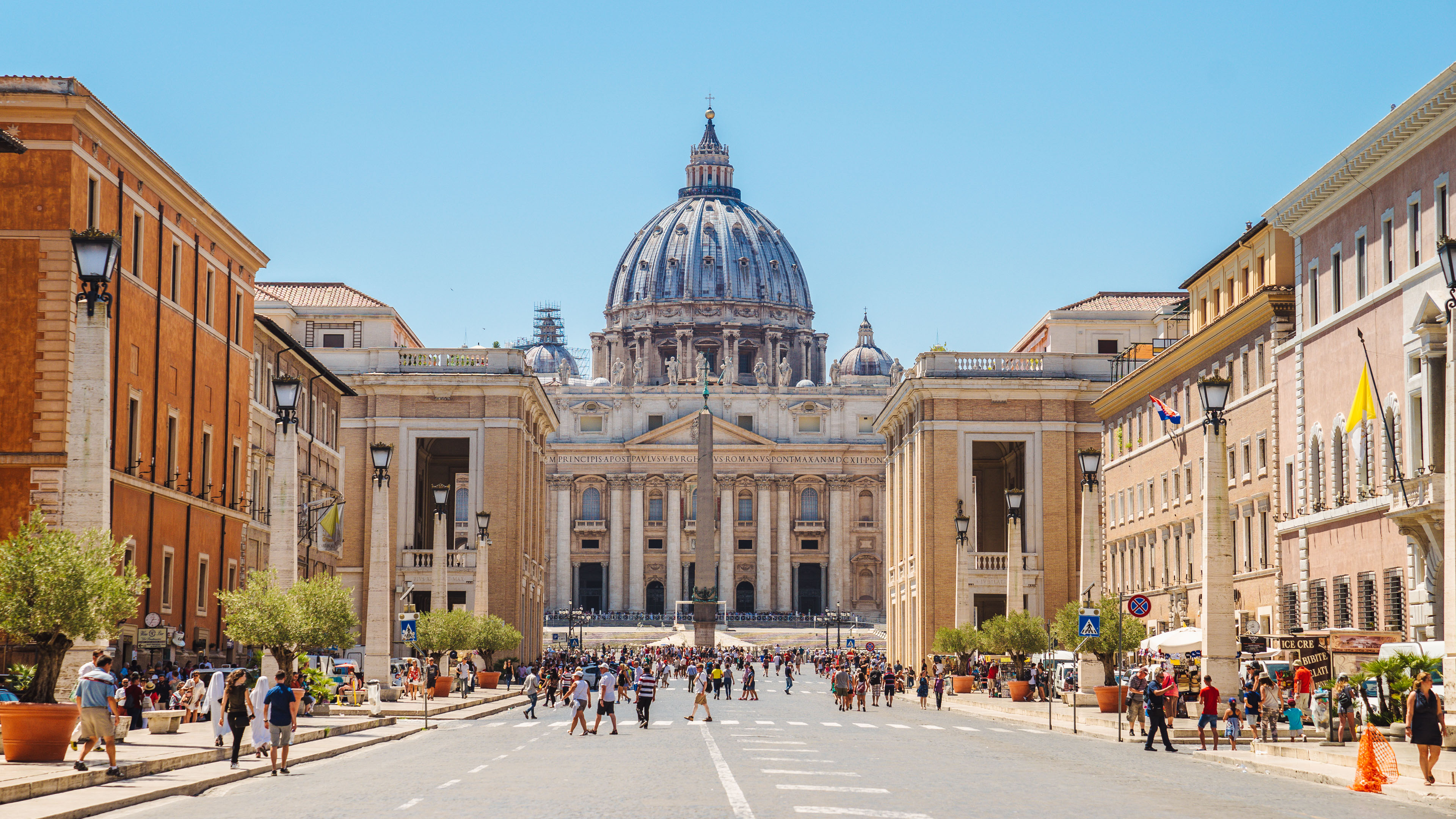
A view from the Via della Conciliazione in Rome, Italy

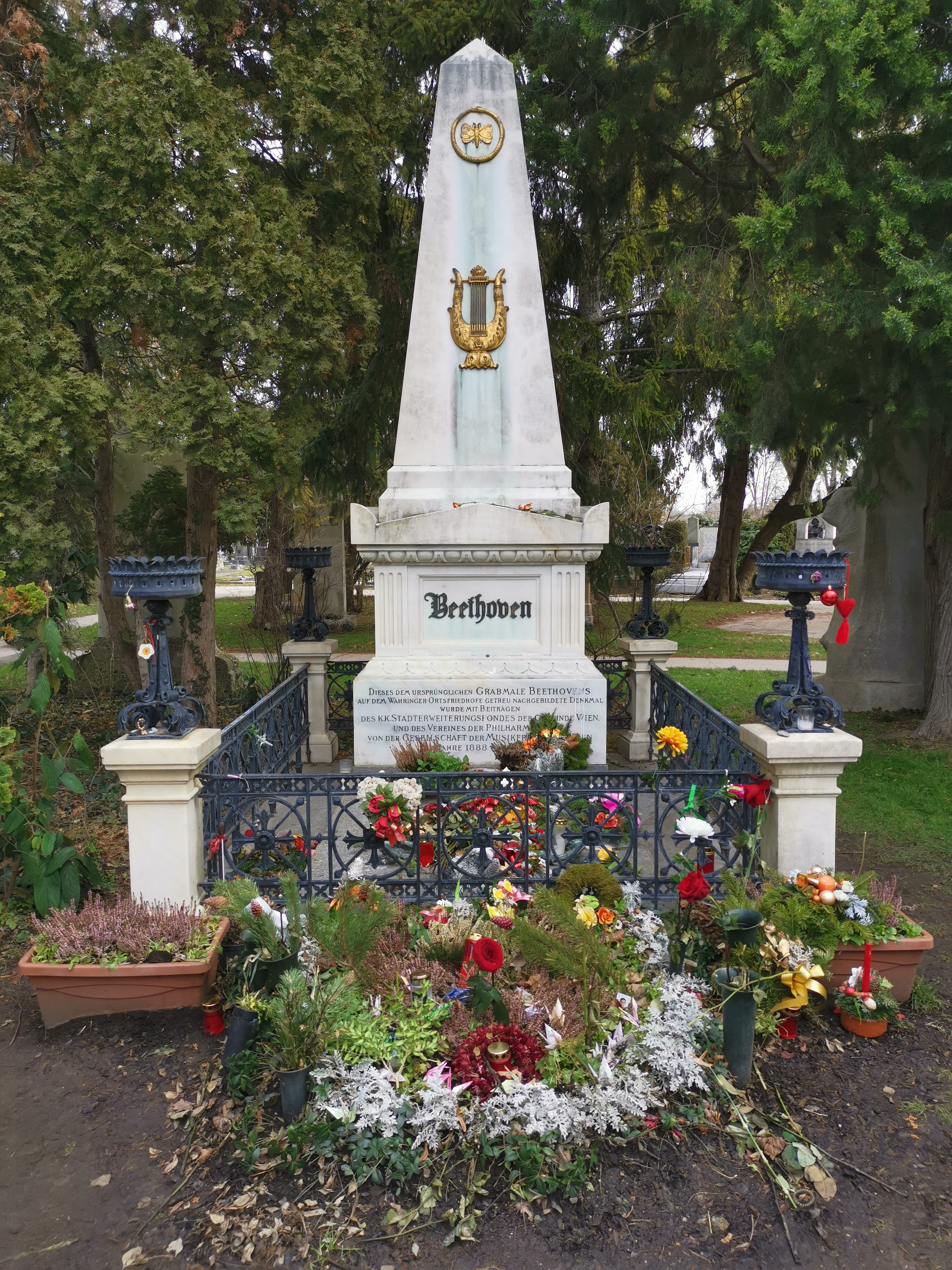
Grave of Ludwig van Beethoven (1770–1827) in the central cemetery of Vienna, Austria

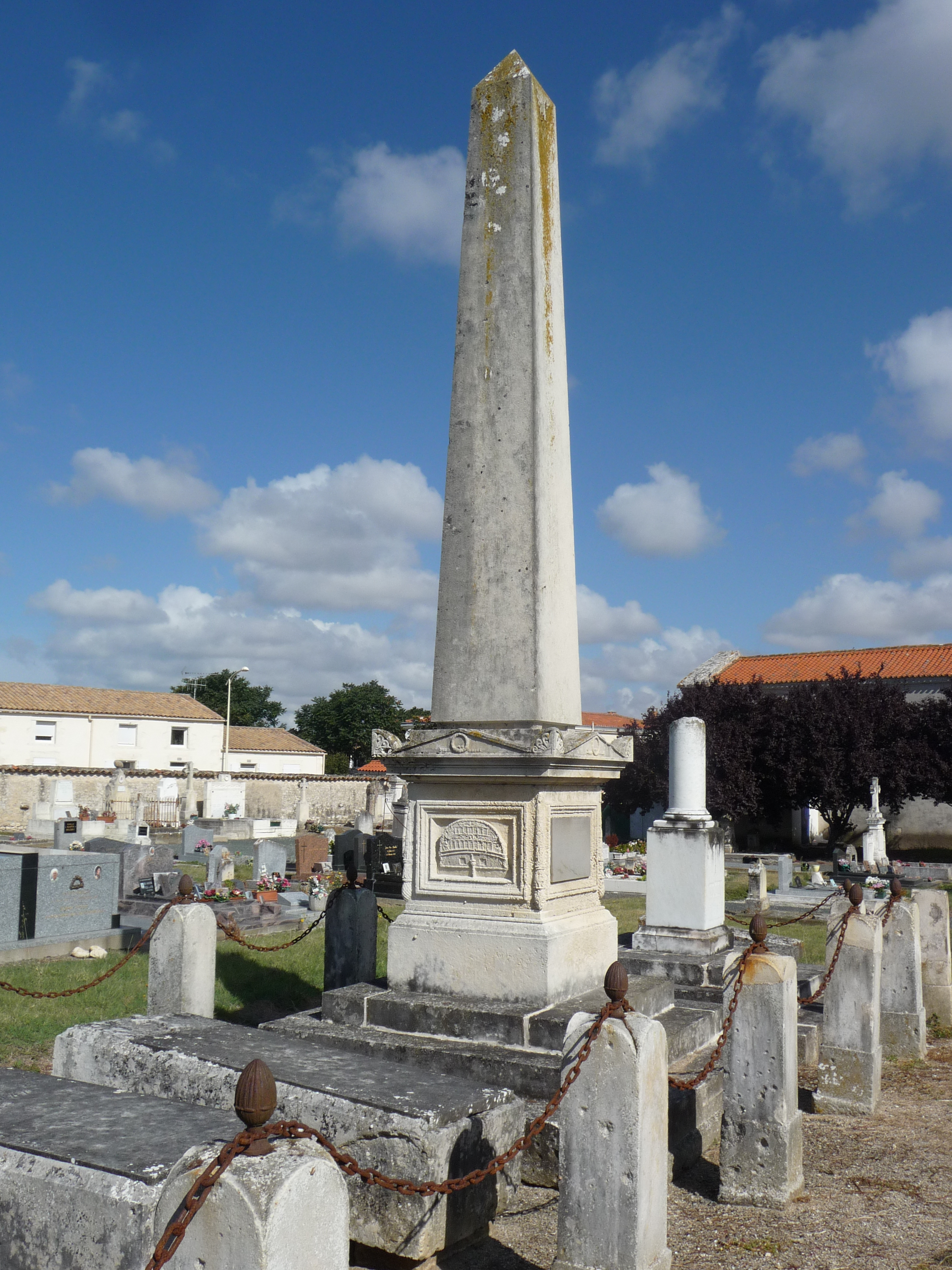
Grave of Jean-Baptiste Hubert (1781–1845) in the cemetery of Yves, Charente-Maritime, France

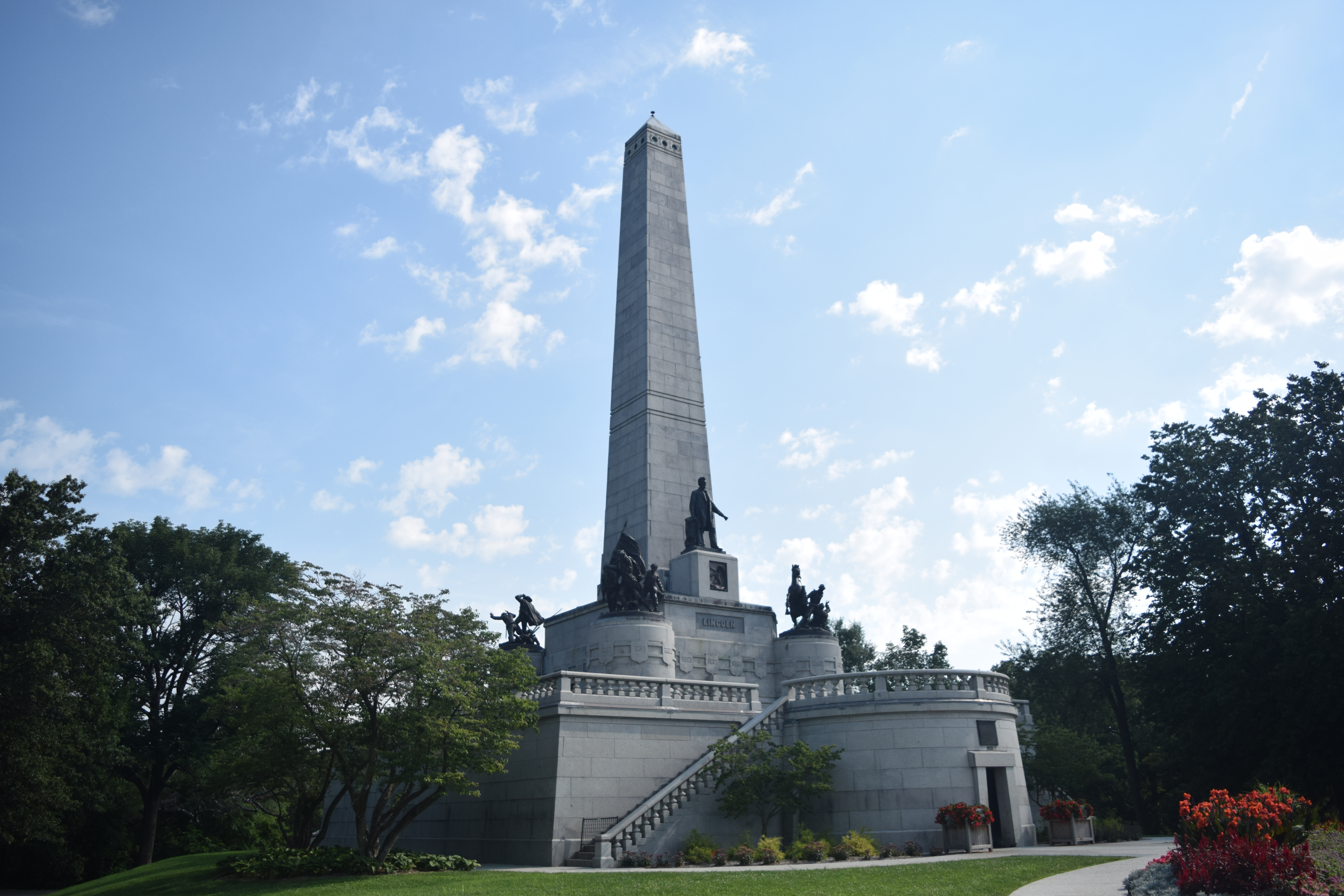
Tomb of Abraham Lincoln in Oak Ridge Cemetery in Springfield, Illinois, U.S.

=== Transportation and erection experiments ===
In late summer 1999, Roger Hopkins and Mark Lehner teamed up with a NOVA crew to erect a 25-ton obelisk. This was the third attempt to erect a 25-ton obelisk; the first two, in 1994 and 1999, ended in failure. There were also two successful attempts to raise a 2-ton obelisk and a 9-ton obelisk. Finally in August–September 1999, after learning from their experiences, they were able to erect one successfully. First Hopkins and Rais Abdel Aleem organized an experiment to tow a block of stone weighing about 25 tons. They prepared a path by embedding wooden rails into the ground and placing a sledge on them bearing a megalith weighing about 25 tons. Initially they used more than 100 people to try to tow it but were unable to budge it. Finally, with well over 130 people pulling at once and an additional dozen using levers to prod the sledge forward, they moved it. Over the course of a day, the workers towed it 10–20 feet. Despite problems with broken ropes, they proved the monument could be moved this way. Additional experiments were done in Egypt and other locations to tow megalithic stone with ancient technologies, some of which are listed here.

One experiment was to transport a small obelisk on a barge in the Nile River. The barge was built based on ancient Egyptian designs. It had to be very wide to handle the obelisk, with a 2 to 1 ratio length to width, and it was at least twice as long as the obelisk. The obelisk was about 3.0 metres (10 ft) long and no more than 5 metric tons (5.5 short tons). A barge big enough to transport the largest Egyptian obelisks with this ratio would have had to be close to 61-metre-long (200 ft) and 30-metre-wide (100 ft). The workers used ropes that were wrapped around a guide that enabled them to pull away from the river while they were towing it onto the barge. The barge was successfully launched into the Nile.

The final and successful erection event was organized by Rick Brown, Hopkins, Lehner and Gregg Mullen in a Massachusetts quarry. The preparation work was done with modern technology, but experiments have proven that with enough time and people, it could have been done with ancient technology. To begin, the obelisk was lying on a gravel and stone ramp. A pit in the middle was filled with dry sand. Previous experiments showed that wet sand would not flow as well. The ramp was secured by stone walls. Men raised the obelisk by slowly removing the sand while three crews of men pulled on ropes to control its descent into the pit. The back wall was designed to guide the obelisk into its proper place. The obelisk had to catch a turning groove which would prevent it from sliding. They used brake ropes to prevent it from going too far. Such turning grooves had been found on the ancient pedestals. Gravity did most of the work until the final 15° had to be completed by pulling the obelisk forward. They used brake ropes again to make sure it did not fall forward. On 12 September they completed the project.

This experiment has been used to explain how the obelisks may have been erected in Luxor and other locations. It seems to have been supported by a 3,000 year-old papyrus scroll in which one scribe taunts another to erect a monument for "thy lord". The scroll reads "Empty the space that has been filled with sand beneath the monument of thy Lord." To erect the obelisks at Luxor with this method would have involved using over a million cubic meters of stone, mud brick and sand for both the ramp and the platform used to lower the obelisk. The largest obelisk successfully erected in ancient times weighed 455 metric tons (502 short tons). A 520-metric-ton (570-short-ton) stele was found in Axum, but researchers believe it was broken while attempting to erect it.

== See also ==
- Huabiao – Ceremonial column in China
- Menhir – Large upright stone placed by humans
- Obelix – Cartoon character in the French comic book series Asterix
- Obelus – Historical annotation mark or symbol, also known as obelisk
  - Dagger (mark) – Typographical symbol (†)
- Phallic architecture – Architectural or sculptural structures representing the human penis
- Stele – Stone or wooden slab erected as a monument
- Washington Monument – U.S. national memorial in Washington, D.C.
- List of Egyptian obelisks
- List of megalithic sites
- List of modern obelisks
- List of obelisks in Rome
- List of pre-Columbian engineering projects in the Americas
