= Caesarea obelisk =

Coordinates: 32°29′54.85″N 34°53′55.04″E

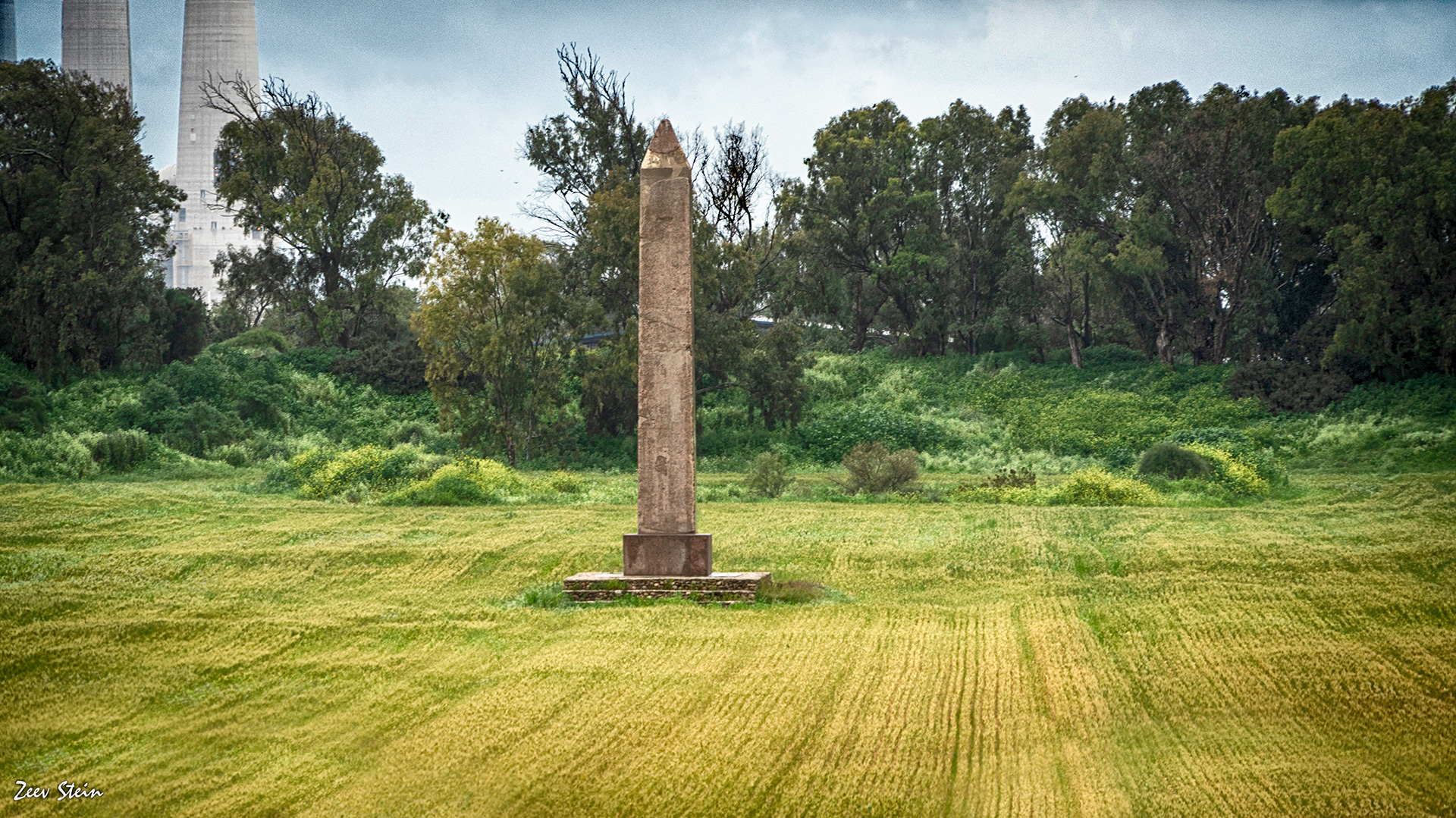
Caesarea obelisk. In the distance, the chimneys of Hadera powerplant.

The Caesarea obelisk is a red granite Obelisk 12 metres high (10.5 + 1.4 m), which was erected in the hippodrome of Herod the Great's new-built Roman city of Caesarea Maritima, now Israel. The obelisk seems to have been erected after Herod's time, in the 2nd century CE. The obelisk was discovered in 1980, broken into three sections and buried in the ruins of the hippodrome, where it must originally have been a major feature. It was restored and reerected in 2001.

Trophy obelisks were erected in similar urban contexts by Herod's Roman patrons. An obelisk erected in the Hippodrome of Constantinople remains in situ. Another, formerly in the Circus of Nero, Rome, was moved to Saint Peter's Square in the 16th century.
