= Keisarinnankivi =

Monument in Helsinki

Coordinates: 60°10′03.5″N 24°57′16″E

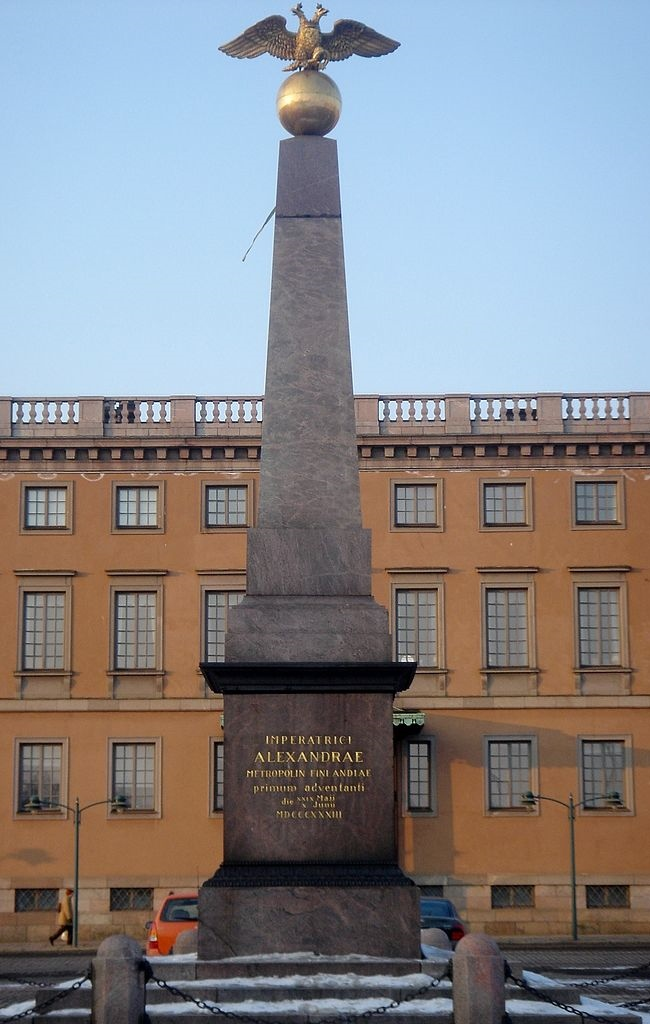
The Keisarinnankivi monument is located at the Helsinki Market Square in front of the embassy of Sweden.

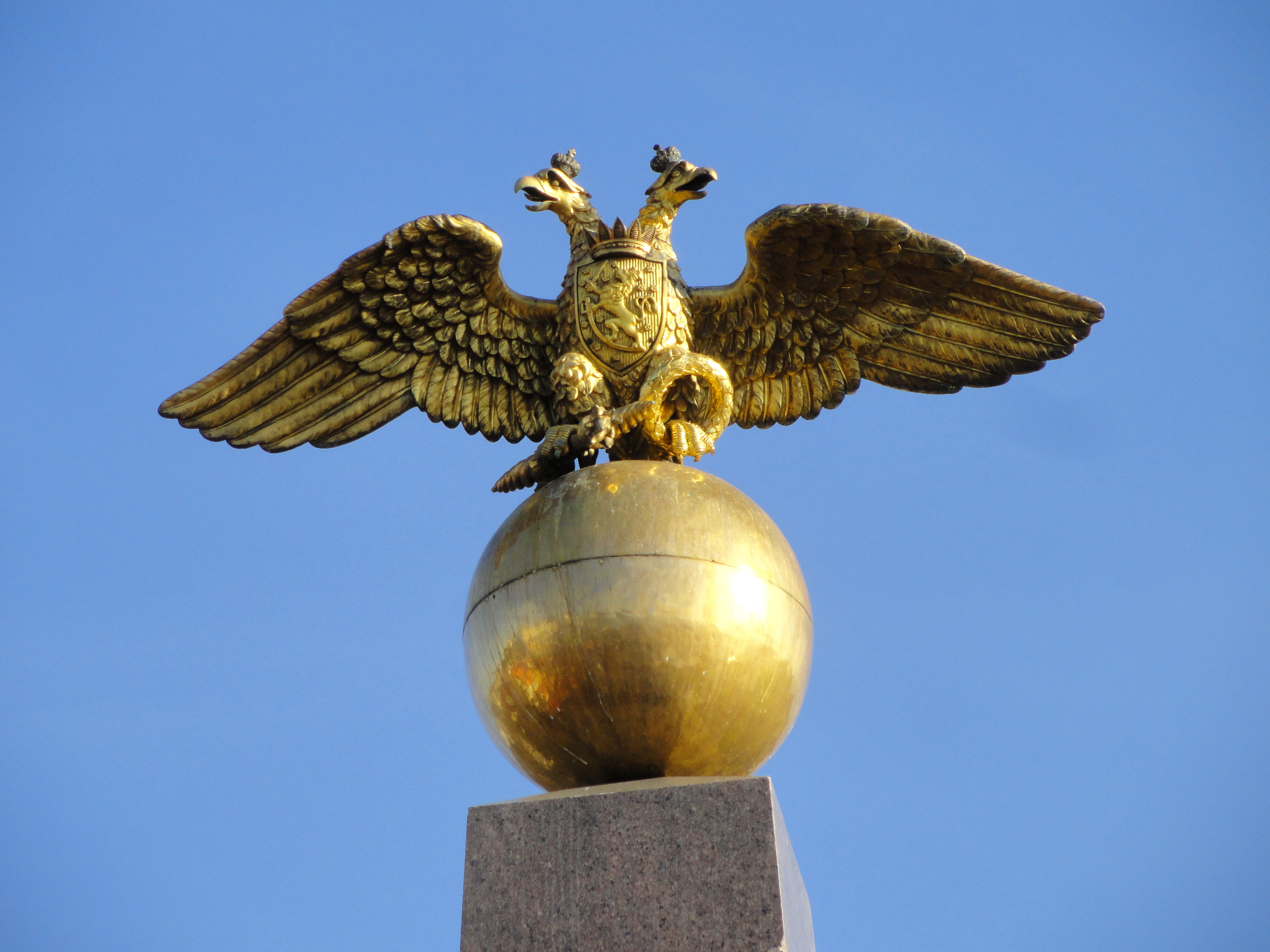
A close-up of the double-headed eagle sitting on a sphere at the top of the monument.

Keisarinnankivi (Finnish for "the stone of the empress") is a monument located at the Market Square in Kaartinkaupunki in central Helsinki, Finland. The monument, designed by Carl Ludvig Engel, is the oldest public monument in Helsinki. It was revealed with celebrations on the name day of Nikolai on 18 December 1835 to commemorate the first visit to Helsinki by Empress Alexandra Feodorovna, wife of Emperor of Russia Nicholas I. The monument was erected at the spot where the imperial couple stepped ashore from the steamship Ischora on arrival in Helsinki on 10 June (Old Style: 29 May) 1833. The monument was funded by a national collection of funds and by a grant given by the Imperial Senate of Finland.

The monument is an obelisk made of red granite, topped with a gilded bronze sphere. On top of the sphere is the symbol of Imperial Russia, a double-headed eagle. The eagle sports the lion coat of arms of the Grand Duchy of Finland on its chest. The gilded eagle was designed by the avian painter Magnus von Wright.

The southern side of the monument bears a Latin inscription and the northern side bears a Finnish one, both explaining the purpose of the monument. At the time of the erection of the monument, it was unusual to use Finnish in such an official connection, as the official and main language of Finland at the time was Swedish. Finnish was only made an official language in Finland in 1883. The inscriptions read:

- IMPERATRICI ALEXANDRAE METROPOLIN FINLANDIAE primum adventanti die XXIX Majj X Junii MDCCCXXXIII
- KEISARINNA ALEXANDRALLE SUOMEN PÄÄˍKAUPUNGISSA ensikerran käyneelle XXIX. p: Touko- X. p: kesä-kuussa MDCCCXXXIII

An English translation is: "To the Empress Alexandra, who visited the capital of Finland for the first time on 29 May, 10 June 1833".

After the February Revolution on 17 April 1917 Russian seamen tore down the bronze sphere and double-headed eagle on top of the monument and removed the inscriptions on the base of the monument. The double-headed eagle was broken when torn down, but both the eagle and the sphere acting as its base still remained. They were reinstated after repairs in 1971 after first consulting the Soviet Union to verify it did not oppose this. The bronze sphere was gilded again in 2000 to celebrate the 450th anniversary of the city of Helsinki and its role as the European Capital of Culture at the time.
