= Market Square, Helsinki =

Square in Helsinki, Finland

Coordinates: 60°10′01″N 24°57′18″E

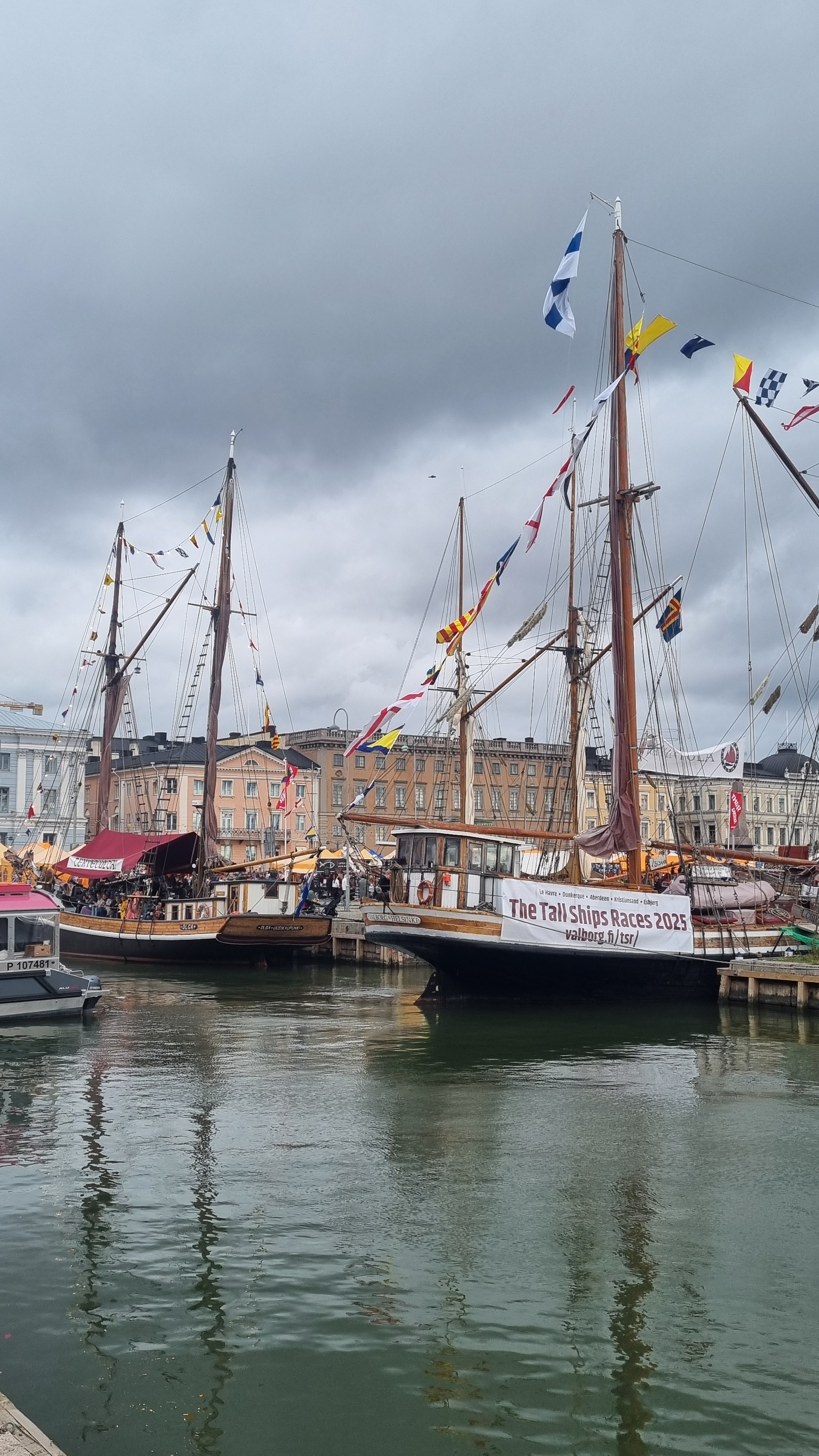
The Market Square during the Herring Market. The Herring Market was founded in 1743.

The Market Square (Finnish: Kauppatori, Swedish: Salutorget) is a central square in Helsinki, Finland. It is located in central Helsinki, at the eastern end of Esplanadi and bordering the Baltic Sea to the south and Katajanokka to the east. HSL maintains a year-round ferry link from Market Square to Suomenlinna, and in the summer there are also private companies providing ferry cruises, both to Suomenlinna and to other nearby islands. The Presidential Palace, Helsinki City Hall, Swedish Embassy and the Stora Enso Headquarters building (designed by Alvar Aalto) are all located adjacent to Market Square.

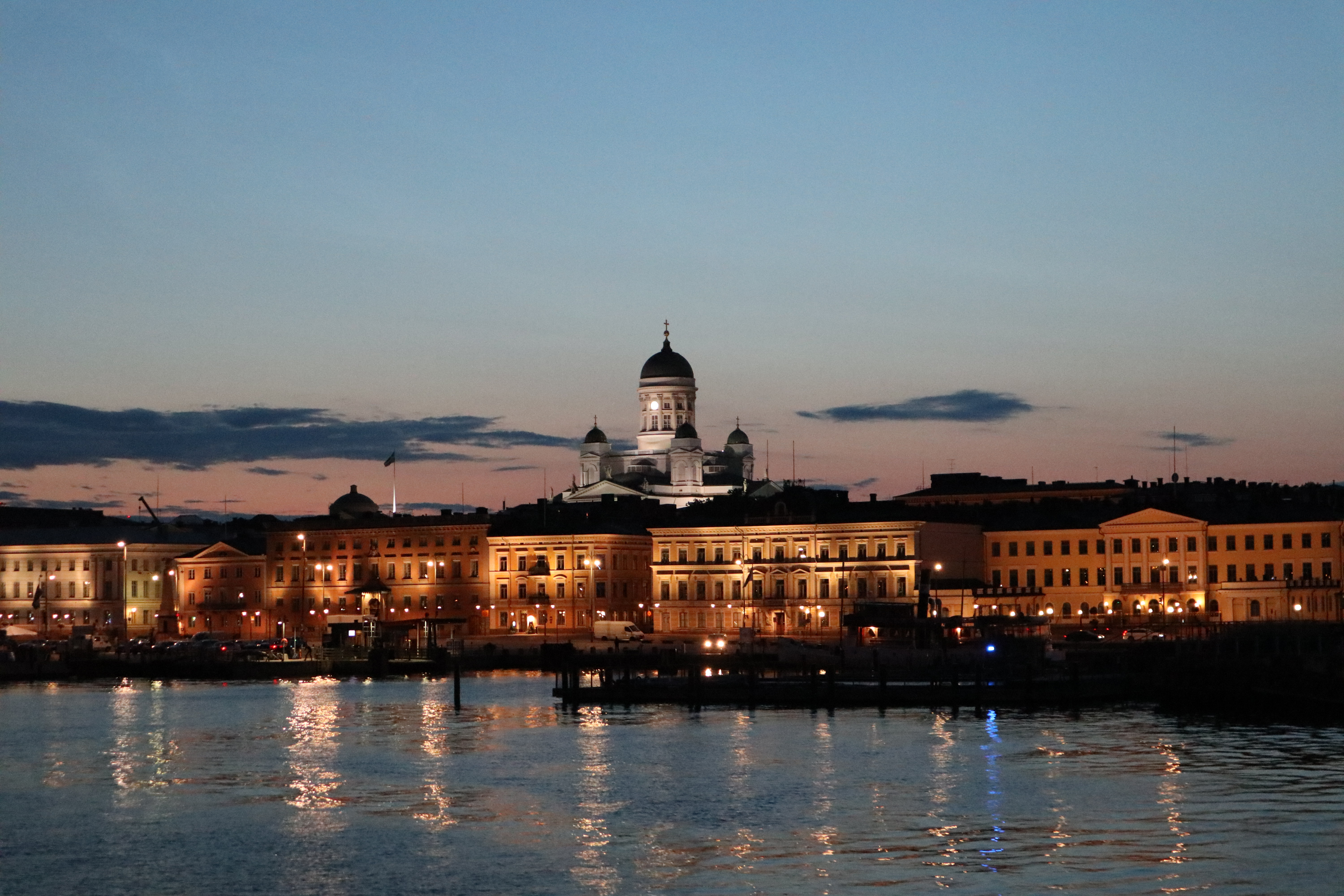
The Market Square from the sea.

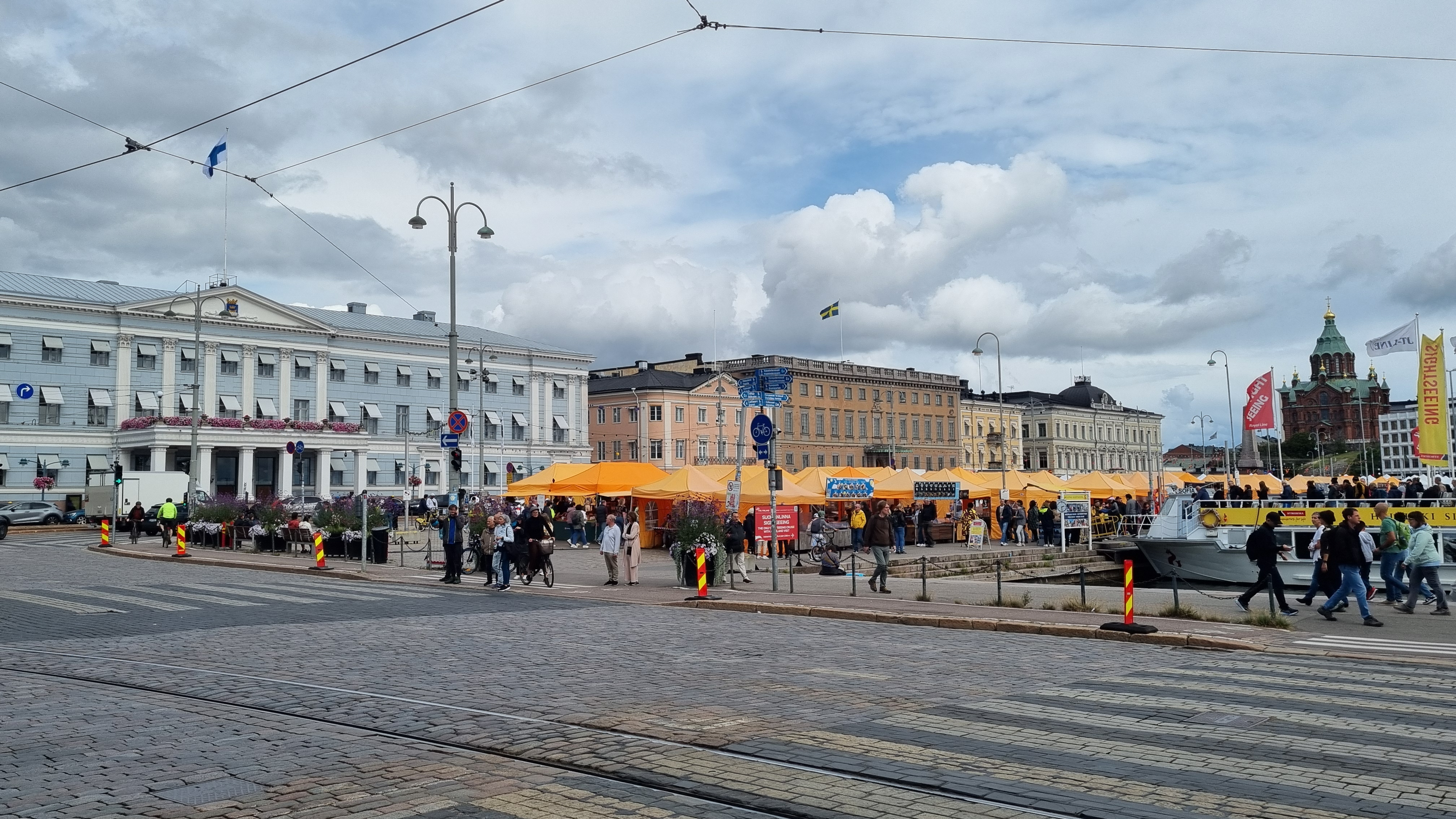
The Market Square in August 2025.

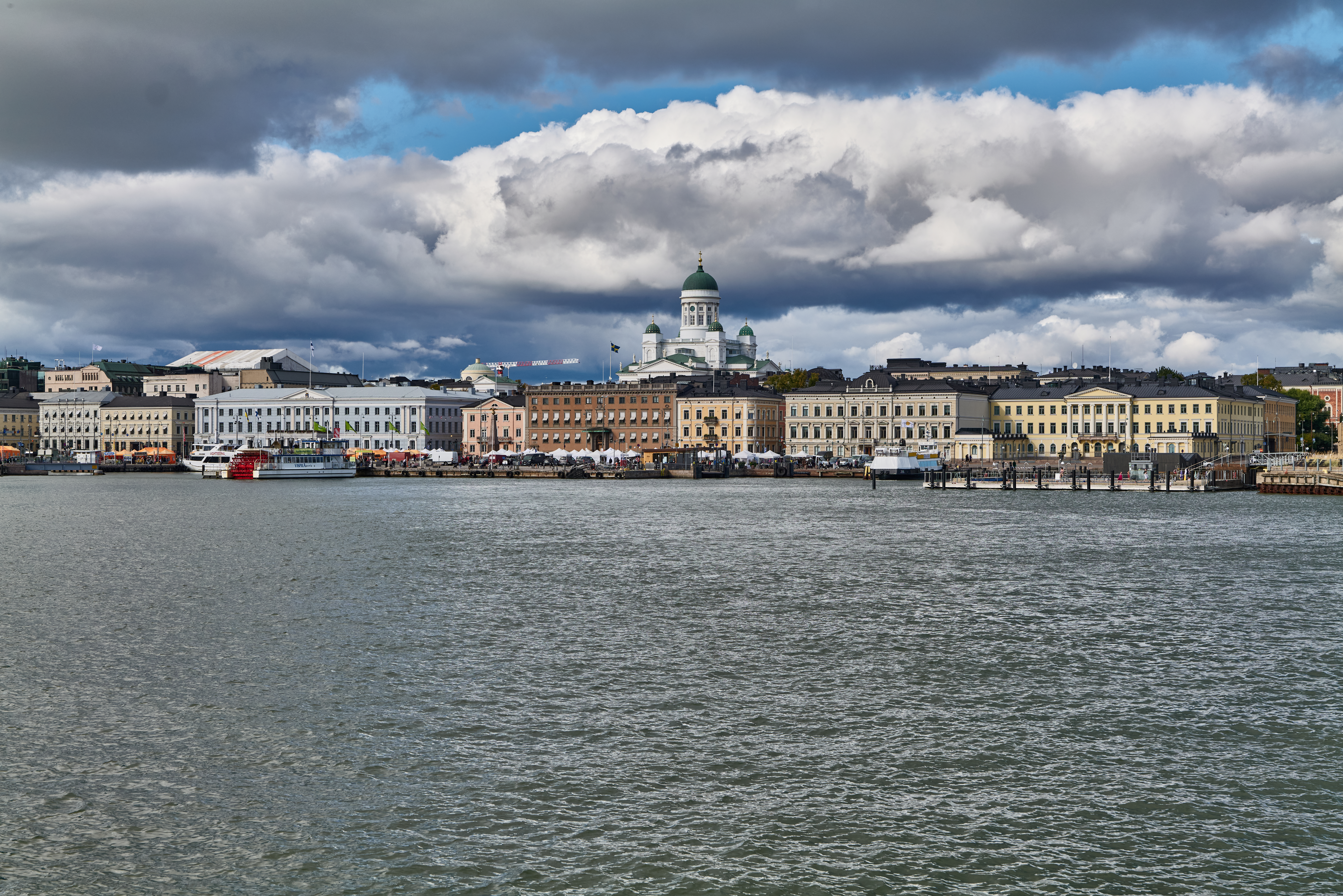
The Market Square from the Suomenlinna Ferry.

From spring to autumn, the Market Square is active with vendors selling fresh Finnish food and souvenirs. There are also many outdoor cafés at the square. Some cafés also provide meat pastries (Finnish: lihapiirakka).

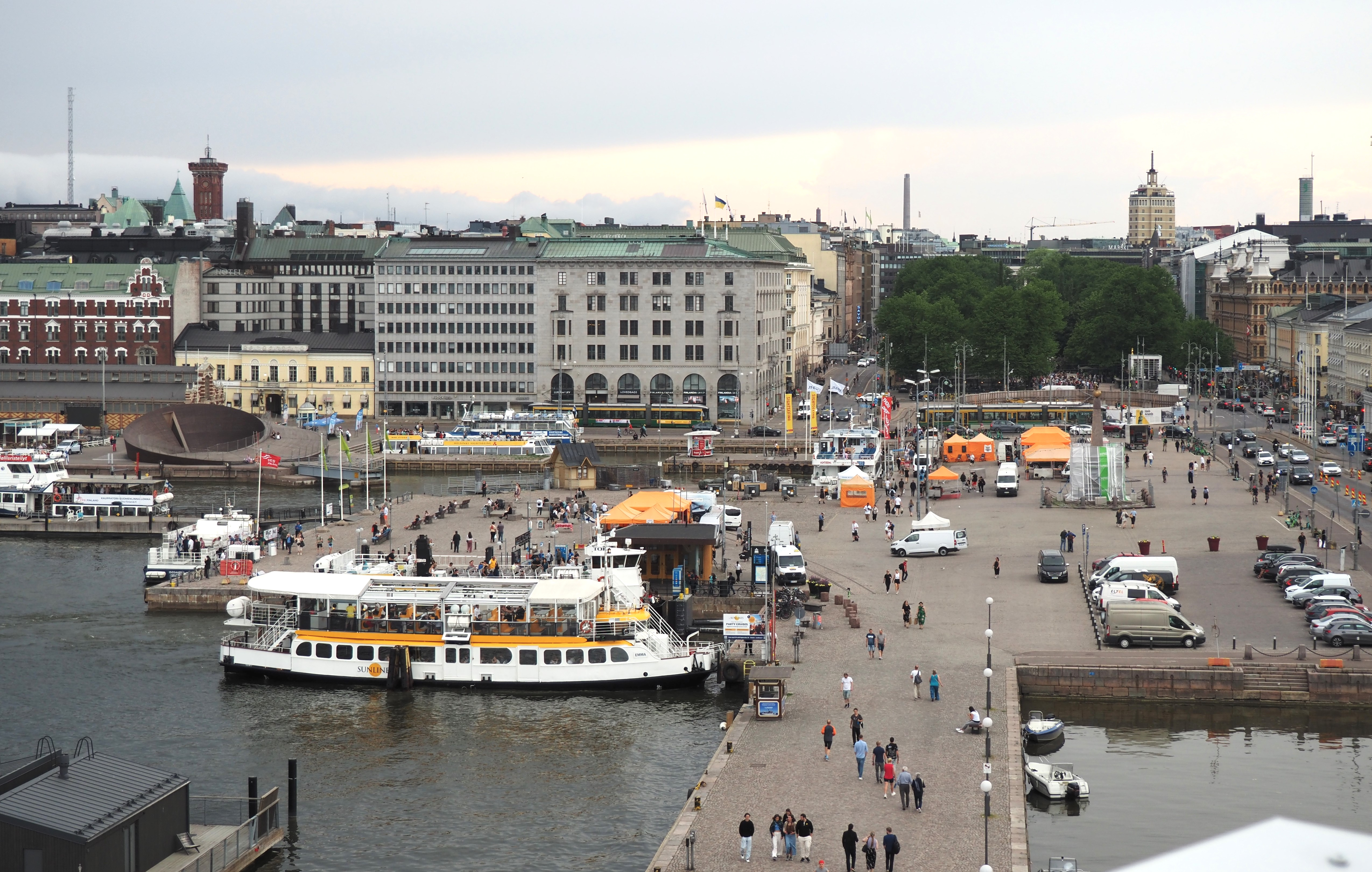
The Market Square's west side.

A long tradition at the Market Square is a display of old American cars on the first Friday of every month. Any motorist with an interest in old American cars may participate in the display. In 2025, Classic Car Parade was arranged at the Market Square. The parade showcased a vast number of American cars.

Seagulls have become an increasing menace in the Market Square, swooping down to snatch snacks and ice cream from the hands of unsuspecting tourists.

== History ==
=== Swedish Era 1550-1809 ===
Up to the early 19th century, the site of the Market Square was the muddy bottom of the Kaupunginlahti bay with fishing piers. The bay was used as a marketplace by local fishermen who attached their boats to the piers and sold fish to the people in Helsinki. Around the site of the current street Pohjoisesplanadi was the street Eteläinen Rantakatu, beyond which lay the city proper. The market square at the time was the Suurtori square (Finnish for "Great Square"), located around the site of the current Senate Square.

=== Grand Duchy of Finland (1809-1917) ===
A Stockmann department store started operating at the address Pohjoisesplanadi 5 under the leadership of merchant Heinrich Georg Franz Stockmann in 1862.

In 1883, industrialist Hugo Robert Standertskjöld purchased Pohjoisesplanadi 3 and transformed the building into a Neo-Renaissance style city palace.

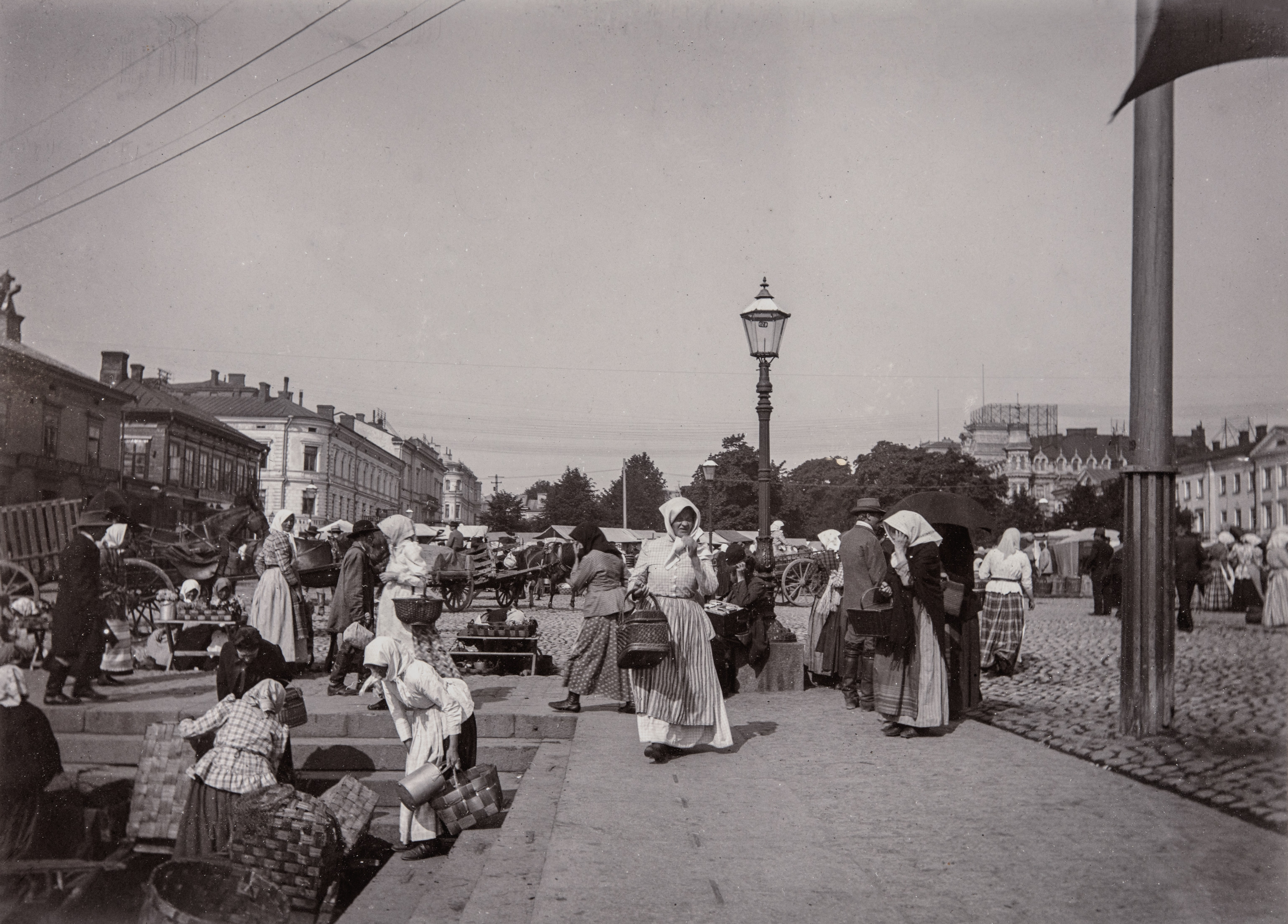
Market Square c. 1890

=== Republic of Finland ===
The King of Sweden, Gustaf V, and Queen Victoria, made the first official state visit to Finland in 1925. Gustaf V arrived at the Market Square waterfront by ship, where he was received with fanfares. Gustaf V met the President of Finland, Lauri Kristian Relander, at the Presidential Palace.

Queen Elizabeth II of the United Kingdom and Prince Philip visited Finland in 1976 and 1994. On both occasions, the royal couple arrived in Helsinki aboard Her Majesty's Yacht Britannia, which anchored at the edge of the Market Square. In 1976 the royal couple met President Urho Kekkonen, and in 1994 President Martti Ahtisaari. In 1994, a couple of thousand citizens gathered at the square to watch the arrival of the royal couple.

In 1990, U.S. President George H. W. Bush shook hands with citizens at the Market Square. In 2018, French President Emmanuel Macron enjoyed coffee at the market with then President Sauli Niinistö.

== Architecture and design ==
=== Construction in the 1800s ===
Filling the muddy and shallow bay bottom required a great deal of filling land to build a wide market square suitable for ship traffic. Three harbour basins were built at the square: one at the eastern end for traffic to Sveaborg (now known as the Linnanallas basin), one at the western end for fishing boats (now known as the Cholera Basin) and one to the south of it for steamships (now known as the Vironallas basin). The canal separating Katajanokka from the mainland was also dug during the construction. In the early 1830s the market square was paved with cobblestones.

In the 1890s the Helsinki harbour rail leading to Katajanokka was built along the shore of the market square; because of this the square was expanded seaward and two turning bridges were built at either end of it to allow trains to pass over the mouth of the Cholera Basin and the Katajanokka canal. Train traffic to Katajanokka ended in the 1980s and the tracks were dismantled. About twenty metres of track still remains on the cobblestones at the square, and a disused old bridge turner's cabin remains near the Cholera Basin.

== See also ==
- Havis Amanda
- Keisarinnankivi
- Helsinki City Hall
- Palace Hotel
- Old Market Hall, Helsinki
- Presidential Palace
- Uspenski Cathedral
- Senate Square
- Esplanadi
- Hakaniemi market square
