= Obelisk (hieroglyph) =

Egyptian hieroglyph

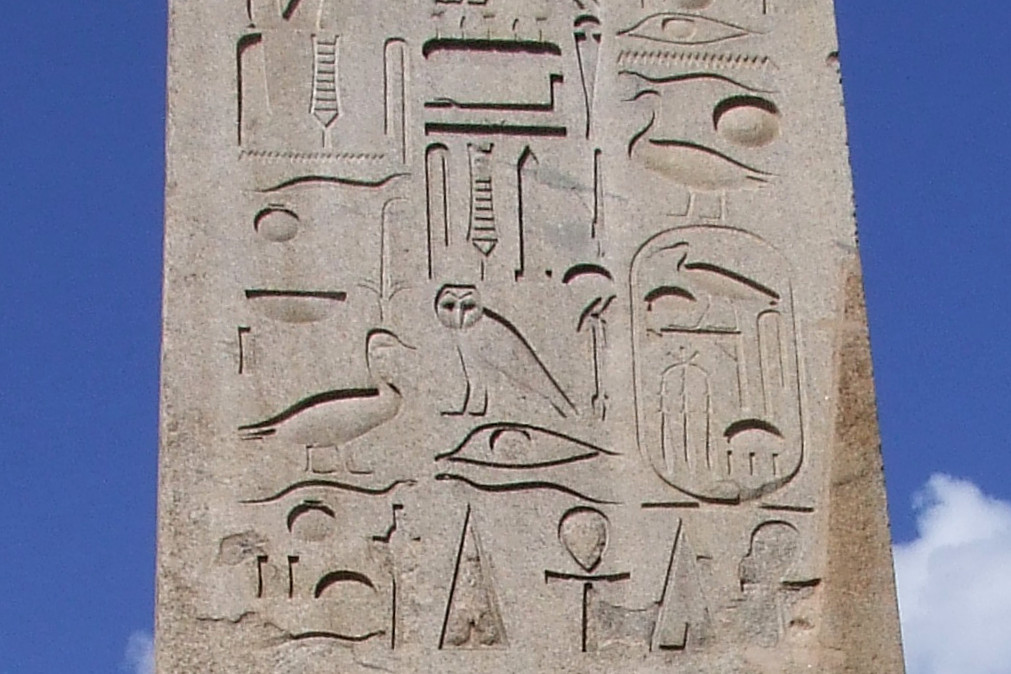
Middle column with story of the obelisk's erection (using mast and obelisk hieroglyph).

O25
Obelisk
in hieroglyphs

The ancient Egyptian Obelisk hieroglyph, Gardiner sign listed no. O25 is a portrayal of the obelisk. The hieroglyph is commonly used on erected Egyptian obelisks, as there is often a discussion of the event of its erection: a historical event, as well as an accomplishment of the pharaoh, and the Egyptian Kingdom.

== Usage ==
The obelisk hieroglyph in the Egyptian language is t(kh)n, and is the identical word with the same spelling (different determinatives), for 'to beat a drum', musician, etc. There are other meanings for 'tekhen', as well. The obelisk is a determinative in the Egyptian language, and the word t(kh)n has multiple spellings, since obelisk construction was done over various time periods. Some spellings are: X1 Aa1 N35 O25 X1 Aa1 N35 W24 Z7 O25 O39 The second spelling uses the shortened variety of the block-of-stone (hieroglyph), N39 as the 2nd determinative.

Preceded by A32 Y7 A26 drumbeat musician-with-instrument -- -- t(kh)n t(kh)nu	O25 obelisk -- -- t(kh)n	Succeeded by X1 N37 D21 color-red see: Deshret (Red Crown) -- -- t(sh)r

== Gallery ==

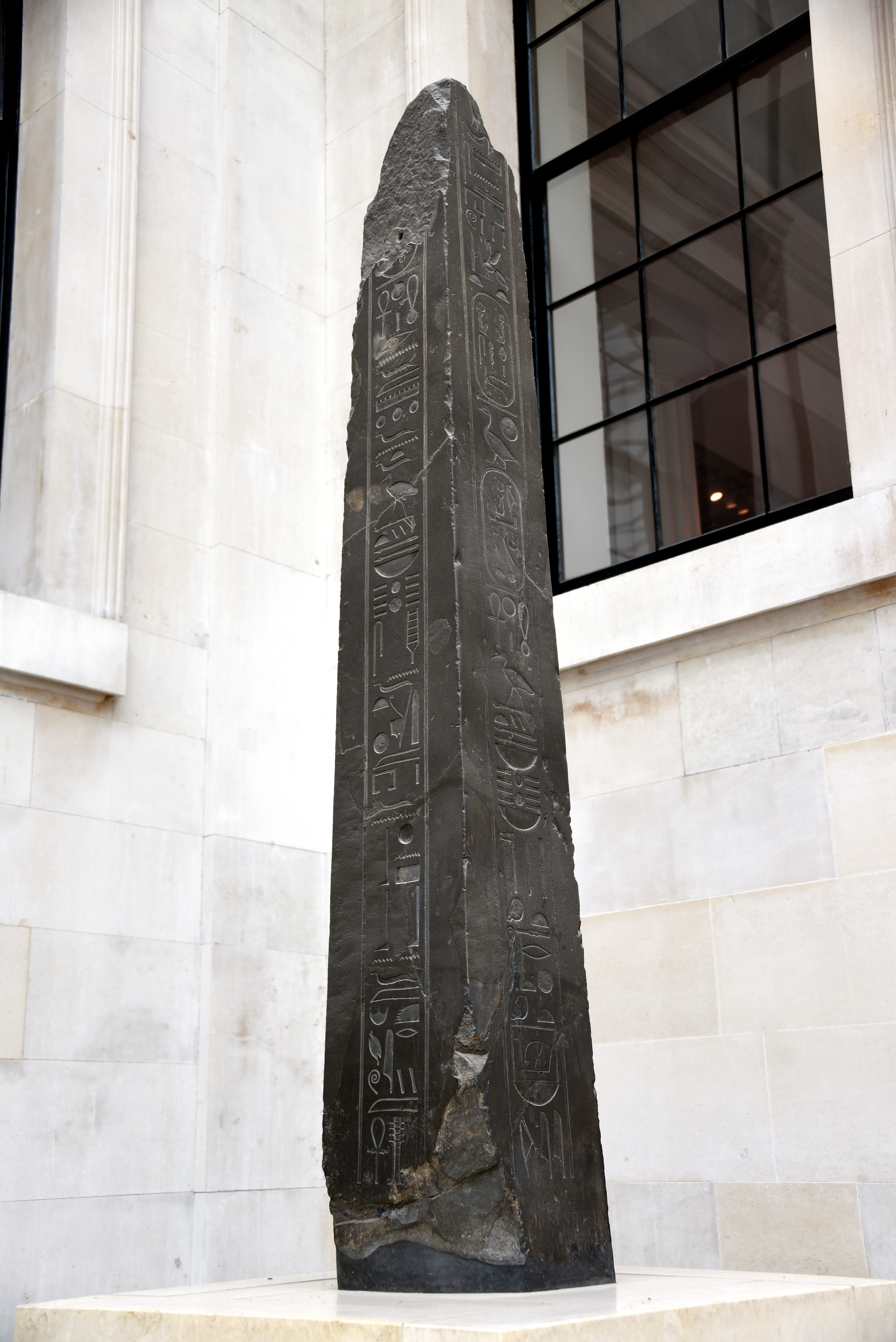
Nectanebo II obelisk
(at a courtyard of the British Museum)

== See also ==
- Gardiner's Sign List#O. Buildings, Parts of Buildings, etc.
- List of Egyptian hieroglyphs
