= List of modern obelisks =

This is a list of obelisks built after the 16th century. See List of obelisks in Rome, List of Egyptian obelisks for some ancient obelisks.

== Modern obelisks ==
(Listed in date order)

=== 17th and 18th centuries ===
Obelisk name	Image	Location	Country	Elevation		Completed	Coordinates	Notes
Obelisk name	Image	Location	Country	m	ft	Completed	Coordinates	Notes
The Fountain of Four Dolphins fr:Fontaine des Quatre Dauphins		Aix-en-Provence, Bouches-du-Rhône	France			1667	43°31′35″N 5°26′44″E	Built with Sainte Baume stone, and commissioned as part of an urban renewal project in the 17th Century by Archbishop Michel Mazarin after whom the square and district are named.
San Juan de Salcedo Monument Plaza Salcedo Obelisk		Plaza Salcedo, Vigan, Ilocos Sur	Philippines			17th century (date uncertain)	17°34′31″N 120°23′15″E	An obelisk in the centre of Plaza Salcedo, in the midst of a modern (1970's) fountain and reflecting pool, dedicated to the Spanish conquistador Juan de Salcedo, who explored northern Luzon in 1572–1573 and founded the settlement that became Vigan. Described as a 17th-century monument, it is considered the oldest of its kind in the area.
Market Square obelisk		Ripon, North Yorkshire	United Kingdom	24	80	1702	54°08′11″N 1°31′25″W	The earliest surviving free-standing monumental obelisk in Great Britain, and constructed under then Mayor, John Aislable. It was built as part of a public works program of improvements to Ripon and to replace an earlier market cross. It is capped with a weather vane designed to incorporate the Wakeman's Horn, featured on the coat of arms of the town.
Stillorgan Obelisk		Stillorgan, Dublin	Ireland	30	100	1727	53°17′12″N 6°10′53″W	Somewhat mysterious, potentially a folly. Constructed of cut granite. Commissioned by Lord Allan as a memorial to his wife (interestingly, she outlived him). Believed to be designed by Edward Lovett Pearce. One of the earliest, if not the first, obelisk-type monuments in Ireland. It may also have been intended as a form of poor relief to provide employment.
St. Bartholomäi Church Spire St. Bartholomäi Kirche Jonitz/Dorfkirche Jonitz		Waldersee, Dessau-Roßlau, Sachsen-Anhalt	Germany	42	138	1722–1725	51°50′23″N 12°16′27″E	The spire of the church is an obelisk, which replaced an earlier tower in the 18th century. The church was transformed into its present style with the obelisk tower by Prince Leopold III, Duke of Anhalt-Dessau
St Luke Church Spire		Old Street, Islington, London	United Kingdom			1727–1733; Spire by Nicholas Hawksmoor	51°31′31″N 0°05′39″W	Steeple of St Luke's Church. The obelisk spire is an unusual feature for an Anglican church. The spire, topped with a weather vane depicting a dragon's head with a fiery tail which was misinterpreted locally as a louse, earned the church the nickname "lousy St Luke's".
Queen Anne Obelisk		Wentworth Castle, Barnsley, South Yorkshire	England	24	80	1734	53°31′19″N 1°30′03″W	Sandstone ashlar obelisk, likely designed by James Gibbs and built by the Bower family, masons for Thomas Wentworth, 1st Earl of Strafford. The inscriptions on the monument are thought to carry coded Jacobite messages.
Boyne Obelisk or King William's Obelisk	(Remains)	Oldbridge, County Louth	Ireland	53	174	1736 detonated 1923	53°43′31″N 6°25′00″W	Controversial monument erected to commemorate William of Orange's victory at the Battle of the Boyne in 1690. It was the tallest obelisk in Europe at the time of its construction. Several attempts to demolish the obelisk were made before final obliteration in 1923.
Queen Square Obelisk		Queen Square, Bath, Somerset	United Kingdom	12.2	40	1738	51°23′00″N 2°21′49″W	Erected in 1738 by Beau Nash to honour Frederick, Prince of Wales. The obelisk originally stood 70 feet (21 m) tall, but was damaged in a severe gale in 1815 and truncated, requiring it to be re-cut, reducing it to its present height.
Conolly's Folly		Leixlip, County Kildare	Ireland	43	140	1740	53°22′10″N 6°33′36″W	A folly topped with an obelisk, commissioned by Katherine Conolly in memory of her husband, William Conolly who had been Speaker of the Irish House of Commons, and died in 1729. The folly was constructed specifically as a form of poor relief for the inhabitants of Celbridge during the Irish Famine of 1740-41.
Killiney Hill Obelisk		Killiney Hill Park, Killiney, County Dublin	Ireland			1742	53°15′56″N 6°06′43″W	A cone-shaped obelisk on the summit of Killiney Hill, also known as the Mount Mapas Obelisk. erected in June 1742 by John Mapas (also spelled Malpas) as a famine relief project to provide employment for the poor during the Irish Famine of 1740-41, and dedicated to those who lost their lives during that period. It was restored in 2007–2008 by Dún Laoghaire-Rathdown County Council.
Mamhead Obelisk		Mamhead, Teignbridge, Devon	United Kingdom	30	100	1742–1745	50°37′00″N 3°31′14″W	Constructed of snecked, grey, ashlar limestone, topped with a ball finial and a copper weather vane in the shape of a flaming arrow. Built as a landmark for shipping out of the Port of Exeter, by Thomas Balle, then owner of the Mamhead estate.
Umberslade Obelisk		Umberslade Hall, Nuthurst, Warwickshire	United Kingdom	21	70	1749	52°20′32″N 1°47′17″W	Constructed with limestone ashlar. Commissioned by Lord Archer during a period of re-landscaping of his manor's gardens. Several theories have been proposed for its erection but the reasons are unrecorded.
General Wolfe's Obelisk		Stowe Gardens, Stowe,Buckinghamshire	United Kingdom			1754	52°02′32″N 1°01′04″W	Dedicated to General James Wolfe, an icon of the Seven Years' War. The obelisk was built from stone from another statue, and previously stood in another part of the park in which it now stands.
Montreal Park Obelisk		Riverhead, Sevenoaks, Kent	United Kingdom			1761	51°16′29″N 0°09′59″E	Constructed of Kentish Ragstone. Built by Lord Jeffery Amherst, recording his service. Registered as a War Memorial related to the Seven Years' War.
St George's Circus Obelisk		St George's Circus, Southwark, London	United Kingdom	4.56	15.0	1771; Moved 1897; Returned 1998	51°29′55″N 0°06′17″W	A stone obelisk erected to mark the completion of the new roads through St. George's Fields, it was the first purpose-built traffic junction in London and originally featured four oil lamps affixed to it. Moved c.1897, to make way for a clock-tower celebrating the Diamond Jubilee of Victoria, into Geraldine Mary Harmsworth Park. Returned to its original position in 1998.
Kagul Obelisk ru:Кагульский обелиск		Tsarskoye Selo (Pushkin), Saint Petersburg	Russia	10.7	35	1771–1772	59°42′52″N 30°23′32″E	Obelisk is one of two erected in honor of Count Pyotr Rumyantsev. It was commissioned by Empress Catherine the Great and is constructed principally of Siberian grey marble, with steps and plinth of Tivdia red marble and pink granite. This obelisk specifically commemorates the Russian victory at the Battle of Kagul, where 17,000 men routed a 150,000-strong Ottoman army.
Rumyantsev Obelisk ru:Румянцевский обелиск		Rumyantsev Square (ru:Румянцевская площадь), Vasilyevsky Island, Saint Petersburg	Russia	21.3	70	1799	59°56′18″N 30°17′33″E	One of two obelisks in Saint Petersburg in honour of Count Pyotr Rumyantsev. It is cut from grey Serdobol granite and crowned with a bronze gilded sphere bearing an Imperial eagle. Commissioned by Emperor Paul I to commemorate the victories of the Field Marshal in the Russo-Turkish Wars of 1768–1774 and 1787–1792. Originally installed on the Field of Mars, it was moved to its current location in 1818. A garden was laid out around the obelisk in 1865–1867.
The Toll Pyramid of Gnodstadt de:Mautpyramide von Gnodstadt		Marktbreit, Bavaria	Germany	10	33	1766–1773	49°37′17.55″N 10°06′58.22″E	A sandstone obelisk, erected on the orders of Margrave Alexander of Brandenburg-Ansbach to mark the border of his territory and to commemorate the completion of the Chaussee (Bundesstraße 13 today) from Würzburg to Ansbach. From 1806 to 1814 it served as a Duchy customs post or toll (German:Maut) station, hence its nickname. Originally on a traffic island, it was demolished in a severe accident in 2010, restored and re-erected 15m to the East in 2012.
The Chesma Obelisk; The Chesmensky Obelisk ru:Чесме́нский обели́ск		Gatchina Palace Park, Gatchina, Leningrad Oblast	Russia	13.4	44	1775	59°34′01″N 30°06′17″E	An obelisk constructed of marble in four colours, commemorating the Imperial Russian Navy's victory over the Ottoman navy at the Battle of Chesma (24–26 June 1770) during the Russo-Turkish War of 1768–1774. Commissioned during the period when Gatchina belonged to Prince Grigory Orlov, who was the brother of Alexey Orlov-Chesmensky, commander of the fleet and hero of the battle.
The Liberty Column da:Frihedsstøtten		Vesterbrogade, Copenhagen	Denmark	20	66	1797	55°40′27″N 12°33′48″E	A red Nexø sandstone obelisk erected to commemorate the peasant reforms of 1788, which led to the abolition of adscription (Danish: stavnsbåndet), a form of serfdom. It was funded by the bourgeoisie of Copenhagen to demonstrate gratitude for the reforms and to counter pressure from the nobility to repeal them. Renovated in 1850–51, dismantled during the construction of the Central Station and Boulevard Line in the early 1900s. It was re-inaugurated in 1999 after another renovation.
The Villa Medici Obelisk Obelisco di Villa Medici		Villa Medici, Pincian Hill, Rome	Italy			1972	41°54′31.8″N 12°28′59.5″E	Often cited as "a 19th-century copy" of the Boboli obelisk moved to the Boboli Gardens in Florence. It is reported by Villa Medici that the obelisk which stands at the Villa Medici is a copy, cast of marble and epoxy resin, produced in 1972, commissioned by Balthus and made by Michel Bourbon.
James's Street Obelisk Drinking Fountain		James's Street, Dublin	Ireland			1790	53°20′36″N 6°17′25″W	A Portland stone obelisk with four sundials and a drinking fountain at its base, erected by Charles Manners, 4th Duke of Rutland, who served as Lord Lieutenant of Ireland from 1784 to 1787, and was responsible for several other drinking fountains erected around Dublin. The fountain was restored in 1995 by Dublin City Council.
Dangan Obelisk; Summerhill Obelisk		Dangan Castle, near Summerhill, County Meath	Ireland	14	45	1790	53°30′43″N 6°44′54″W	A yellow brick obelisk, almost 45 feet (13.7 m) in height, consisting of a "needle" on an arcaded open pedestal. It is the sole surviving obelisk from the Dangan Castle estate, which once reportedly boasted over one hundred follies and garden buildings, including at least twenty-five obelisks. Restored and repaired to its original height in 2014.
Obelisk of the Constable; Connétable Obelisk ru:Площадь Коннетабль		Gatchina Palace Park, Gatchina, Leningrad Oblast	Russia	32	105	1793	59°33′36″N 30°06′47″E	The Connétable is a square centred on an obelisk. The complex was commissioned by Pavel Petrovich, future Tsar Paul I, after visiting Château de Chantilly, whose Terrasse du Connétable and Statue of the Constable (Duke Anne de Montmorency, 1493–1567) were the inspiration. It was rebuilt after being obliterated by lightning in 1881, and was restored and repaired several times between 1904 and the 1980s. Finally it was rebuilt in 2017.
Vallotton Monument		Wexford	Ireland			1793	52°20′25″N 6°28′19″W	A controversial monumental obelisk built in honor of Maj. Charles Vallotton who was killed during a 1793 protest against the government policy of tithing. This began an escalation that culminated in the Rebellion of 1798. The monument was rededicated to all who lost their lives between 1793 and 1798 at the rebellion's bicentennial.
The Old Obelisk at Slottsbacken sv:Obelisken i Stockholm		Slottsbacken, Gamla stan, Stockholm	Sweden	30	98	3 October 1800 Dismantled 2017 Re-erected 2020	59°19′33.12″N 18°04′17.42″E	An obelisk which was composed of 17 granite drums believed to be quarried from Ulfsunda. It was commissioned by King Gustav III (but unveilled by his successor King Gustav IV) in honor of the Stockholm Burghurs and their protection of the city during the Russo-Swedish War (1788-1790). Due to irreprable age and weather damage, dismantled in 2017 to be replaced.
Emmeramsplatz Obelisk		Schlosspark, Schloss Thurn und Taxis, Regensburg, Bavaria	Germany			c.1780s Re-erected 1803	49°00′51.6″N 12°05′37.4″E	Neoclassical limestone obelisk bearing the initial cartouche of Prince Carl Anselm von Thurn und Taxis. Originally erected in the gardens of de:Schloss Freudenhain, Passau in the 1780s by Prince-Bishop Count Auersperg; relocated to Regensburg after the Josephinian secularization in the early 1800s.

=== 19th century ===
Obelisk name	Image	Location	Country	Elevation		Completed	Coordinates	Notes
Obelisk name	Image	Location	Country	m	ft	Completed	Coordinates	Notes
The Nelson Memorial		Springfield Park, Knotty Ash, Liverpool, Merseyside	United Kingdom	12	40	c. 1806	53°25′06″N 2°53′54″W	A red sandstone monument erected to the memory of Admiral Lord Nelson after his death at Trafalger in 1805. The Monument was restored in 2013-14.
Nelson Monument		Portsmouth Harbour	United Kingdom	37	120	1808	50°51′38″N 1°08′03″W	Dedicated to Nelson by those who fought at Trafalgar. Based on the Stelae of Axum in Ethiopia.
Prince Carl Anselm Memorial		Fürst-Anselm-Allee, Regensburg, Bavaria	Germany			1806	48°52′40.76″N 12°34′23.44″E	Neoclassical obelisk built from stones of demolished city fortifications. Designed by Emanuel Herigoyen and commissioned by Fürstprimas Carl von Dalberg to honor Prince Carl Anselm von Thurn und Taxis (1733–1805), founder of the tree-lined avenue (Allee) surrounding Regensburg's old town.
The Wandersmann Obelisk de:Am Wandersmann		Hofheim am Taunus	Germany	11	36	1813	50°03′23″N 8°23′02″E	Flat-topped obelisk with a fountain, constructed of coloured sandstone. Frederick Augustus, Duke of Nassau had ordered the road on which the obelisk stands built in 1813. The obelisk commemorates its completion.
Constitution Monument		St. Augustine, Florida	United States	7.6	25	1814	29°53′35.38″N 81°18′15.53″W	One of many constructed, by decree, in commemoration of the Spanish Constitution of 1812 across the Spanish Empire. A later decree was made to demolish these monuments, but St. Augustine resisted the order. It is potentially the only remaining, unaltered, monument of this type in the Western Hemisphere.
Brightling Needle		Brightling, East Sussex	United Kingdom	20	65	circa 1815	50°57′57.96″N 0°22′37.25″E	A Folly, a.k.a. Brightling Down and Brightling Beacon, commissioned by John "Mad Jack" Fuller and designed by Sir Robert Smirke. Not to be confused with The Sugarloaf, a different, conical, construction on the same site. Its purpose remains mysterious.
Arlington Revolutionary War Monument		Old Burying Ground, Arlington, Massachusetts	United States	5.8	19	1818	42°24′58″N 71°09′31″W	A granite obelisk erected above a stone vault, holding the re-interred remains of 12 soldiers who fell during the Revolutionary War in Menotomy (now Arlington).
George IV Monument		Dún Laoghaire, County Dublin	Ireland	7.0	23	1823	53°17′37.72″N 6°7′54.44″W	Obelisk topped with a crown, resting on four balls. The town was renamed Kingstown (until it reverted to Dún Laoghaire in 1921) to celebrate George VI's visit in 1821, as it was the first royal visit to Ireland since Richard II.
Blantyre Monument		Erskine, Renfrewshire	United Kingdom	24	80	circa 1825	55°54′57″N 4°29′45″W	Dedicated to Robert Walter Stewart the 11th Lord Balantyre.
Monument to the Construction of the Brest Roadway (Monument to Labour) pl:Pomnik Budowy Szosy Brzeskiej (Pomnik Pracy)		Grochów, Warsaw	Poland	46	14	21 May 1825	52°14′45.81″N 21°04′35.32″E	Formally, the Pomnik Budowy Szosy Brzeskiej, Monument to the Construction of the Brest Roadway. Made of iron, covered in bas-reliefs depicting hard labour. First Polish Monument to commemorate anonymous labourers, celebrates the completion of the cobblestone road between Warsaw and Brest (now part of National Road 2). A pair, another matching obelisk stands at Terespol.
Monument to the Construction of the Brest Route Pomnik budowy Traktu Brzeskiego		Terespol, Lublin Voivodeship	Poland	14	46	1825	52°04′33″N 23°36′48″E	The Terespol counterpart to the Monument to Labour listed above. Similarly constructed of iron with bas-relief.
Union of Lublin Monument pl:Pomnik Unii Lubelskiej w Lublinie		Lublin	Poland	13	43	1826	51°14′53.39″N 22°33′37.2″E	Cast-iron obelisk created on the initiative of Stanisław Staszic. It commemorates the union of the crowns of the Kingdom of Poland and the Duchy of Lithuania in 1569. The monument was awarded the European Heritage Label in 2007.
Captain Cook's Monument		Easby Moor, Great Ayton, North Yorkshire	United Kingdom	15.5	51	1827	54°28′58.88″N 1°05′26.95″W	A hollow obelisk constructed from local sandstone blocks, with a Benben stone capstone, erected in 1827 by Robert Campion.
Groton Monument		Fort Griswold, Groton, Connecticut	United States	41	135	1830	41°21′18″N 72°4′46″W	Constructed of granite, the first patriotic monument of the obelisk type in the USA. Commemorates 88 American defenders who were killed or massacred after surrendering to British forces under Benedict Arnold on 6 September 1781. Dedicated on 6 September 1830, the 49th anniversary of the Battle of Groton Heights.
Bunker Hill Monument		Charlestown, Massachusetts	United States	67	221	1827-43	42°22′35″N 71°03′41″W	Commemorates the Battle of Bunker Hill, an early major battle of the American War of Independence/The American Revolutionary War. The first monument on the site was an 18 feet (5.5 m) wooden pillar constructed in 1794. The present monument took 17 years to complete and is the first colossal obelisk erected in North America.
Spencer Monument		Blata l-Bajda	Malta	15	50	1831 (relocated 1893)	35°53′17″N 14°29′53″E	Also known as the Ponsonby Obelisk. It commemorates the death of Captain Sir Robert Cavendish Spencer, cousin of the then Governor of Malta, Sir Frederick Ponsonby.
Obelisk in Odinslund sv: Obelisken i Odinslund		Odinslund, Fjärdingen, Uppsala	Sweden			1832	59°51′25″N 17°37′56″E	A granite obelisk commissioned by King Charles XIV John of Sweden and inaugurated on 6 November 1832 – the bicentenary of King Gustav II Adolf's death at the Battle of Lützen (1632).
Thomas Jefferson's Gravestone		Monticello, Charlottesville, Virginia	United States	1.8	6	1833	38°00′37″N 78°27′08″W	Erected by his family, Jefferson had willed that only three achievements be sketched onto it: Author of the Declaration of Independence, author of the Virginia Statute for Religious Freedom, and father of the University of Virginia.
Karolinenplatz Obelisk de:Obelisk am Karolinenplatz		Karolinenplatz, Munich, Bavaria	Germany	29	95	18 October 1833	48°08′40.9″N 11°34′09.0″E	A bronze-clad brick obelisk designed by Leo von Klenze and cast by Johann Baptist Stiglmaier using metal from captured cannons. War memorial for 30,000 Bavarian soldiers who died in Napoleon's Russian campaign of 1812. Commissioned by King Ludwig I, and inaugurated on the 20th Anniversary of the Battle of Leipzig.
The Obelisk of Lions (Monument to the Organic Regulations) ro:Obeliscul cu lei din Iași (Monumentul Regulamentului Organic)		Copou Park, Iași	Romania	13.5	44	1834–1841	47°10′43″N 27°34′02″E	A stone obelisk, one of the oldest monuments in Romania, constructed by public subscription to memorialize the implementation of the Organic Regulations – the first quasi-constitutional law on political, administrative and juridical organisation in the Romanian Principalities. It suffered demage and some vandalism under Soviet rule in the 1940's. It has been renovated several times, most recently beginning in 2022.
The Villa Torlonia Obelisks Villa Torlonia		Villa Torlonia, Via Nomentana, Rome	Italy	10.27	33.7	1842	41°54′55.7″N 12°30′40.4″E	Two obelisks, of Baveno pink granite, dedicated by Prince Allesandro Torlonia to his parents Giovanni and Anna Maria. The obelisks are positioned symmetrically: one dedicated to his father in front of the Casino Nobile's main facade, and the other to his mother at the rear. Their hieroglyphic inscriptions were designed by the Egyptologist Don Luigi Ungarelli.
The Obelisk of Piazza Gioberti Obelisco di Piazza Gioberti)		Corso Giuseppe Garibaldi, Reggio Emilia, Emilia-Romagna	Italy	17.75	58.2	1843	44°41′59.5″N 10°37′36.0″E	A granite obelisk, surmounted with a 5-point gilt star, erected to commemorate the marriage of Francis V of Modena, Duke of Modena and Reggio, to Princess Adelgunde of Bavaria. The square, originally named Piazza Adelgonda in her honour, was renamed Piazza Gioberti in 1859 after the Italian patriot Vincenzo Gioberti and in 1882, the obelisk was rededicated to the first martyrs of the Italian Risorgimento. It's most recent refurbishment was in 2019.
Rutherford's Monument		Boreland Hill, between Anwoth and Gatehouse of Fleet, Dumfries and Galloway	Scotland	17	56	1842	54°52′37.7″N 4°12′10.4″W	A polished granite obelisk, erected to commemorate the 17th-century theologian Samuel Rutherford, who was minister at nearby Anwoth Kirk from 1627 to 1639. Struck by lightning in 1847 and rebuilt in 1851, it was also restored more recently in 2018.
Martyrs' Monument		The Scores, St Andrews, Fife	Scotland	10	33	1842–1843	56°20′36″N 2°48′03″W	A sandstone obelisk, erected in 1842–1843 to commemorate four Protestant martyrs of the Scottish Reformation. The monument was restored in 2013.
Political Martyrs' Monument		Old Calton Burial Ground, Waterloo Place, Calton Hill, Edinburgh	Scotland	27	90	1844	55°57′12″N 3°11′9″W	An ashlar sandstone obelisk erected to commemorate five Scottish political reformers who were convicted of sedition in 1793 and transported to Australia for advocating parliamentary reform and universal suffrage.
Lansdowne Monument; Cherhill Monument		Cherhill Down, near Cherhill, Wiltshire	United Kingdom	38	125	1845	51°25′22.1″N 1°55′57.7″W	A rubble stone, ashlar-dressed obelisk erected by the 3rd Marquess of Lansdowne to commemorate Sir William Petty. Restored in 1990, and further repaired in 2024-5.
The Obelisk		Obelisk Hill, King Edward Park, Newcastle, New South Wales	Australia	6	20	1850	32°55′55″S 151°46′44″E	A sandstone obelisk daymark, erected on the site of the former Government Flour Mill, a convict‑built windmill which had become a vital navigational marker for ships entering Newcastle Harbour.
Wellington Monument		Blackdown Hills, 3 km (1.9 mi) south of Wellington, Somerset	United Kingdom	53	175	1854	50°56′52.8″N 3°13′45.5″W	A three-sided obelisk, tallest in the world of this type. Dedicated to Wellington's Victory at Waterloo in 1815. Construction began in 1817, but stalled after funds ran out; it was completed in its present form in 1854. It was struck by lightning twice in the 19th century, leading to repairs and a height increase in 1892. It was closed in 2007 due to danger to the public, restored 2019-2021 and reopened.
Cape Dombey Obelisk		Robe, South Australia	Australia	12	39	1855	37°9′23″S 139°44′37″E	A Daymark. Some debate over construction date (1852 in other sources). Originally plain white, but repainted to be more visible in 1862. The Obelisk is terminally threatened by erosion and subsidance.
Stoodley Pike Monument		Mankinholes, near Todmorden, West Yorkshire	United Kingdom	37	121	1856	53°42′50″N 2°02′33″W	A gritstone obelisk replacing another (completed after the Battle of Waterloo, but destroyed by lightning and the elements) dedicated to the end of the Crimean War.
Hyde Park Obelisk Thornton Obelisk		Corner of Elizabeth Street and Bathurst Street, Hyde Park, Sydney, New South Wales	Australia	22	72	December 1857	33°52′29″S 151°12′36″E	A sandstone obelisk, capped with a filigreed bronze pyramid-shaped vent, in the Victorian Egyptian style modelled on the London Cleopatra's Needle, built as a sewer ventilation shaft for Sydney's first, planned, underground sewerage system. Unveiled by Mayor George Thornton, after whom it was mockingly nicknamed "Thornton's Scent Bottle". It is Sydney's oldest piece of working infrastructure, and the first public monument erected in Hyde Park.
Herndon Monument		In front of the United States Naval Academy Chapel, Annapolis, Maryland	United States	6.4	21	1860	38°58′56.3″N 76°29′9.2″W	A grey granite obelisk, presented to the US Naval Academy by the Class of 1860 to commemorate the loss of Commander William Lewis Herndon (1813–1857). He had captained the SS Central America and went down with his ship after evacuating women and children, in a hurricane off Cape Hatteras in 1857. It is one of the oldest structures on the Naval Academy grounds (after the Mexican War Midshipmen's Monument), and forms the central part of the Herndon Climb tradition.
The Fontenoy Pyramid Pyramide de Fontenoy		Cysoing, Nord, Hauts-de-France	France	17	56	24 May 1750	50°33′52.92″N 3°13′07.43″E	Triangular, Basècles bluestone obelisk erected by the Abbot of Cysoing Monastery to commemorate the stay of Louis XV in May 1745 on the eve of the victory won a year later by the royal troops in Fontenoy during the War of the Austrian Succession. It was restored in 1888, again in 2013, and underwent further restoration in 2020.
Wellington Monument		Phoenix Park, Dublin	Ireland	62	203	1861	53°20′56.7″N 6°18′11.2″W	Built to celebrate Arthur Wellesley, the "Iron Duke," Duke of Wellington's achievements, as he was born in Dublin. It is the tallest Obelisk in Europe. Initially intended for a different location and with a Statue of Wellesley, but due to lack of funds the obelisk alone was constructed in its present location.
Prince of Wales' Obelisk		BayWorld museum complex, Humewood, Port Elizabeth (now Gqeberha), Eastern Cape	South Africa			22 May 1863	33°58′40″S 25°38′58″E	Carved in France from an igneous rock for the London Exhibition of 1862. Purchased by John Paterson, founder of the Eastern Province Herald, for his business partner George Kemp's memorial. Rejected by the family as too big, it was donated and erected on Market Square to commemorate the marriage of the Prince of Wales (later King Edward VII), and Princess Alexandra of Denmark. It was removed in 1921 and remained in storage until 1975 then re-erected at the BayWorld Museum Complex.
Lincoln Tomb State Historic Site		Oak Ridge Cemetery, 1500 Monument Ave, Springfield, Illinois	United States	36	117	1874	39°49′24″N 89°39′21″W	The complex is the final resting place of President Abraham Lincoln, his wife and sons. The burial of Lincoln has proved controversial. An obelisk tops the monument and stands 117 feet tall.
Tyndale Monument		Nibley Knoll, North Nibley, Gloucestershire	United Kingdom	34	111	1866	51°39′31″N 2°22′21″W	A limestone tower folly commissioned by the 2nd Earl of Ducie commemmorating William Tyndale, biblical translator and Reformer, who was born in the area. The foundation stone was laid in 1863, but disputes slowed construction.
Treue der Union Monument		High Street, Comfort, Kendall County, Texas	United States	7.6	25	10 August 1866	29°58′11″N 98°54′49″W	A limestone obelisk, dedicated on 10 August 1866, commemorating the German‑Texan Unionists who died in the 1862 Nueces massacre and subsequent clashes. It is the marker of the mass grave of the soldiers it memorialises. Treue der Union, meaning "Loyalty to the Union", it is the only German‑language Union monument in the South and the oldest Civil War memorial in Texas.
Nicholson's Memorial نکلسن کی ابلیسک; Nikal Sayn		Tarnol Pass (Margalla Pass), Margalla Hills, near Taxila, Punjab	Pakistan	12	40	1868	33°42′11″N 72°49′29″E	A mildly controversial granite obelisk, porticoed fountain and guardhouse, commemorating Brigadier‑General John Nicholson, a British East India Company officer who died from wounds received at the Siege of Delhi during the Indian Mutiny.
Hamilton Monument		Strand Street, Skerries, Fingal, County Dublin	Ireland			1863–1865 (completed 1870)	53°34′50.45″N 6°06′25.27″W	An obelisk on a rusticated plinth intended as a small-scale replica of the Phoenix Park Wellington Monument. Erected to commemorate James Hans Hamilton, a wealthy landlord and Member of Parliament for County Dublin.
Captain Cook Memorial Obelisk		Monument Track, Kamay Botany Bay National Park, Kurnell, New South Wales	Australia			1870	34°00′16.8″S 151°13′03.2″E	A sandstone obelisk erected to commemorate the centenary of Captain Cook's landing at Botany Bay on 28 April 1770, standing opposite the rock where he is believed to have first set foot on the Australian continent. Commissioned by the Hon. Thomas Holt, NSW Treasurer and local landowner. It bears several plaques, one recording its construction, two containing text from Cook and Banks' journals, and one commemorating the 200th anniversary re-enactment in 1970, attended by Queen Elizabeth II.
The April Peace Pyramid es:Pirámide a la Paz de Abril		es:Plaza de los Treinta y Tres, San José de Mayo, San José	Uruguay			1 June 1873	34°20′23″S 56°42′50″W	An obelisk erected to commemorate the peace agreement of 6 April 1872, which ended the Revolución de las Lanzas, a civil war between the Blanco and Colorado parties. It is made of thirteen blocks of pink granite (representing the Departments of Uruguay separated by white marble plaques, and is crowned by a benben topped with an iron pineapple finial. Four iron spheres representing cannonballs support it, and four marble lions at the base hold shields with patriotic dates.
Dauphin County Veteran's Memorial Obelisk The Harrisburg Obelisk		Third and Division Streets, Harrisburg, Pennsylvania	United States	34	110	1867–1876 (rededicated 12 February 1960)	40°17′30″N 76°54′00″W	An Egyptian-style granite obelisk quarried from the banks of the Susquehanna River and erected between 1867 and 1876 as a tribute to Dauphin County's Civil War soldiers. Originally erected in front of the State Capitol but dismantled to be restored. It was re-erected and re-dedicated in 1960 in its present location.
Saratoga Battle Monument		Saratoga National Historical Park, Victory, Saratoga County, New York	United States	47	155	1877–1883	43°00′30″N 73°38′22″W	A rock‑faced granite obelisk memorializing the Battle of Saratoga. The cornerstone was laid on 17 October 1877 (the centenary of Burgoyne's surrender), the capstone was placed on 3 November 1882, and the bronze statues were completed in August 1887. It was formally dedicated on 17 October 1912, the 135th anniversary. It features 4 statuary niches representing Schuyler, Morgan and Gates, with the fourth empty representing Arnold.
Washington Monument		National Mall, Washington, D.C.	United States	169.29	555 5	6 December 1884	38°53′22.08″N 77°02′06.84″W	A 555‑foot‑5⅛‑inch marble obelisk on the National Mall, honoring George Washington. Construction ran from 1848 to 1854, halted for two decades, and resumed from 1876 to 1884. Upon completion, it was the tallest building in the world. The monument has 896 steps to the 500‑foot observation level and weighs over 80,000 tons above ground.
Oriskany Battlefield Monument		Oriskany, Oneida County, New York	United States	26	85	6 August 1884	43°10′38.3″N 75°22′13.6″W	A limestone obelisk, dedicated on the 107th anniversary of the Battle of Oriskany (6 August 1777), a pivotal and bloody engagement of the American Revolutionary War. It features a number of plaques and bronze bas-reliefs.
Monument to the Restorers pt:Monumento aos Restauradores		Praça dos Restauradores, Lisbon	Portugal	30	98	28 April 1886	38°42′57″N 9°08′30″W	A limestone obelisk inaugurated on 28 April 1886 to commemorate the victory in the Portuguese Restoration War. The obelisk bears bronze plaques on each face listing the names and dates of the major battles of the war. Two allegorical bronze statues flank the pedestal: Independence by José Simões de Almeida (north face) and Victory by Alberto Nunes (south face).
Grave of Ludwig van Beethoven de:Grab von Ludwig van Beethoven	Original Monument; Ortsfriedhof Current; Zentralfriedhof	Original: Währinger Ortsfriedhof (now Schubert Park), Wien-Währing, Vienna Current: Group 32A, Vienna Central Cemetery (Wiener Zentralfriedhof), Simmering, Vienna	Austria	3	9.8	Original: 1827/1828 Current: 1888	Original: 48°13′42″N 16°19′55″E Current: 48°09′07″N 16°26′24″E	A grave monument featuring an obelisk, designed by Ferdinand Schubert (Franz Schubert's brother) and erected in 1827/28 on Beethoven's original grave. That cemetery was later transformed into a park and Beethoven's remains were moved to the Zentralfriedhof in 1888. An exact reproduction of the original was erected in 1888 at the new site. Both are adorned with symbols: a lyre and sun (symbols of Apollo), and a butterfly encircled by an ouroboros serpent (symbolising the soul and eternity or the permanence of art). The current grave is a protected monument. The original grave site is now preserved as a memorial within Schubert Park.
Bennington Battle Monument		Bennington, Vermont	United States	92 or 93	301 or 306	1889	42°53′21″N 73°12′57″W	
Monolith "The Obelisk"		Villalar de los Comuneros, Castile and León	Spain			1889	41°33′00″N 5°08′19″W	
Dalhousie Obelisk		Raffles Place, Central Area	Singapore			1891	1°17′15″N 103°51′8″E	
The Obelisk, Penn State University		University Park, Pennsylvania	United States	10	33	1896	40°47′43″N 77°51′48″W	
Confederate War Memorial		Dallas, Texas	United States	20	66	1896	32°46′32″N 96°47′59″W	
Anspach Fountain		Brussels	Belgium	11	36	1897	50°51′12.95″N 4°20′48.72″E	
Macquarie Obelisk		Macquarie Place, Sydney	Australia	6	20	1818	33°51′48.38″S 151°12′35.96″E	Oldest surviving public monument in Australia; the zero point for measuring road distances in New South Wales.
Anda Monument		Manila	Philippines	15.2	50	1871	14°35′32″N 120°58′24″E	Obelisk erected to honor Simón de Anda, who defended Manila against British occupation in 1762.
Sungei Ujong War Memorial		Malacca City	Malaysia	1.5	4.9	Unknown; Later 19th Century	2°11′29.9″N 102°15′17.9″E	Obelisk-shaped memorial commemorating the British colonial expedition in Sungei Ujong and the soldiers who fell during the conflict.
Tugu Yogyakarta		Yogyakarta	Indonesia	15	49	Rebuilt 1889	7°46′58.5″S 110°22′1.5″E	Originally constructed in 1775, an important historical pillar landmark, topped with a sphere, built by Sri Sultan Hamengkubuwono I, also known as the Golong-Gilig Monument. The obelisk as it stands today was rebuilt in 1889 by the Dutch Colonial Government after an earthquake in 1867.
Fishermen's Memorial Lookout and Obelisk		Port Denison, Western Australia	Australia	4	13	1869	29°16′37.88″S 114°54′54.6″E	A.k.a. Point Leander Obelisk. Originally a pair of daymarks to guide vessels through reefs into Port Irwin (now Port Denison), constructed following the loss of the brigantine Leander in 1853. Dedicated as a fishermen's memorial on 11 November 1979. The site is registered on the Western Australian State Heritage Register.
Fontaine de la Pyramide		Clermont-Ferrand, Puy-de-Dôme, Auvergne-Rhône-Alpes	France			1801	45°46′26″N 3°05′13″E	An obelisk fountain built in 1801 to honour General Louis Charles Antoine Desaix, who died at the Battle of Marengo in 1800.
The Colonel's Stone a.k.a. The Second Duke's Obelisk		Stowe Landscape Gardens, near Buckingham, Buckinghamshire	United Kingdom			1864	52°02′10″N 1°00′33″W	A small granite obelisk erected in 1864 by the Royal Buckinghamshire Yeomanry to the memory of their Colonel, the 2nd Duke of Buckingham and Chandos (1797–1861).

=== 20th century ===
Obelisk name	Image	Location	Country	Elevation		Completed	Coordinates	Notes
Obelisk name	Image	Location	Country	m	ft	Completed	Coordinates	Notes
Villa Medici		Rome	Italy			1972	41°54′32″N 12°28′59″E	A 20th-century cast-copy of the Egyptian obelisk moved to the Boboli Gardens in Florence constructed of marble and epoxy.
William Dudley Chipley Memorial		Plaza Ferdinand VII, Pensacola, Florida	United States			1901	30°24′31.7″N 87°12′50.24″W	
Sergeant Floyd Monument		Sioux City, Iowa	United States	30	100	1901	42°27′45″N 96°22′39″W	
Joseph Smith Birthplace Memorial		South Royalton, Vermont	United States	15	50	1905	43°49′26″N 72°28′21″W	
McKinley Monument		Niagara Square, Buffalo, New York	United States	29	96	1907	42°53′11″N 78°52′41″W	
The Veterans' Monument		Elizabethton, Tennessee	United States			1904	36°20′55″N 82°12′38″W	Dedicated to American Civil War veterans from Carter County, Tennessee.
Samuel Smith Monument		Sefton Park, Liverpool	United Kingdom			1909	53°23′09.67″N 02°56′43.08″W	Designed by C.J. Allen as a memorial to local MP and philanthropist. Granite, with bronze plaques.
Confederate Monument		Finn's Point National Cemetery, Pennsville Township, New Jersey	United States	26	85	1910	39°36′42″N 75°33′22″W	Erected by the U.S. government in 1910 to memorialize Confederate soldiers buried at the cemetery.
Coronation Memorial		Coronation Park, Delhi	India				28°43′23″N 77°11′49″E	To commemorate the founding of New Delhi in 1911 followed by other obelisks around the Rashtrapati Bhavan
Victory Memorial		Fort Recovery, Ohio	United States	31	101	1913	40°24′48″N 84°46′33″W	
Rizal Monument		Luneta Park, Manila	Philippines	12.7	42	1913	14°34′54″N 120°58′36″E	built to commemorate the executed Filipino nationalist, José Rizal.
National Women's Monument		Bloemfontein	South Africa			1913	29°08′30″S 26°12′30″E	
Ozark Trail		Various locations including Stroud, Oklahoma, Farwell, Dimmitt, Wellington, and Tulia, Texas	United States			1913		Formerly a series of 21 obelisks
Meriwether Monument		North Augusta, South Carolina	United States	6.4	21	1916	33°29′51″N 81°58′10″W	Erected by the South Carolina General Assembly to commemorate Thomas McKie Meriwether, the only white man killed in the Hamburg Massacre.
PAX Memorial		Walmer, Port Elizabeth	South Africa	6	20	1919	33°58′28″S 25°34′29″E	A World War I memorial to local fallen soldiers.
Dover Patrol Monument		St Margaret's at Cliffe	United Kingdom	23	75	1919	51°9′24.71″N 1°23′33.55″E	Erected to honour Dover Patrol.
Flagler Monument		Flagler Monument Island, Miami Beach, Florida	United States	34	110	1920	25°47′07″N 80°09′10″W	
Dover Patrol Monument		Cap Blanc-Nez, Sangatte/Escalles	France	23	75	1922	50°55′29.42″N 1°42′35.57″E	Erected to honour Dover Patrol.
Southport War Memorial		London Square, Southport, Lancashire, England	United Kingdom	20.6	67.5	1923	53°38′55″N 3°00′16″W	
Veterans Memorial Plaza		Indiana World War Memorial Plaza, Indianapolis, Indiana	United States	30	100	1923	39°46′25″N 86°9′25″W	
Jefferson Davis Monument		Fairview, Kentucky	United States	107	351	1924	36°50′31″N 87°18′01″W	Commemorating the birthplace of the President of the Confederate States of America
Boer War Monument		ANZAC Station Precinct, Melbourne, Victoria	Australia	23	75	1924	37°50′00″S 144°58′20″E	Originally constructed opposite the Victoria Barracks, Melbourne, on St Kilda Road, but was relocated in 1965. Dismantled and refurbished during the construction of the ANZAC Station Precinct.
Camp Merritt Memorial Monument		Cresskill, New Jersey	United States	20	66	1924	40°56′28″N 73°58′37″W	Monument dedicated to the soldiers who passed through Camp Merritt, New Jersey, en route to Europe in World War I, particularly those who died at the camp due to the influenza epidemic of 1918
Hobart Cenotaph		Queens Domain, Hobart, Tasmania	Australia	23	75	1925	42°52′40″S 147°20′12″E	A World War I memorial
The Big Red Apple		Cornelia, Georgia	United States	2.4	8	1925	34°30′42″N 83°31′36″W	A short square obelisk with the world's largest apple on top stands
Prague Castle Obelisk (or Monolith from Mrákotín)		Prague Castle, Prague	Czech Republic	15.42	50.6	1930	50°5′25″N 14°24′1″E	
Jaipur Column		New Delhi	India	45	148	1930	28°36′51″N 77°12′07″E	
Obelisk of Montevideo (or Obelisco a los Constituyentes de 1830)		Parque Batlle, Montevideo	Uruguay	40	130	1930	34°53′51″S 56°09′52″W	
High Point Monument		High Point, Montague, New Jersey	United States	67	220	1930	41°19′15″N 74°39′42″W	Located on top of New Jersey's highest point, 550 m (1,803 ft) above sea level.
Dover Patrol Monument		John Paul Jones Park, Brooklyn	United States	23	75	1931	40°36′41.18″N 74°2′3.01″W	Erected to honour Dover Patrol.
Foro Italico		Lungotevere Maresciallo Diaz, Rome	Italy			1932	41°55′55″N 12°27′32″E	Erected to honour Benito Mussolini.
Paterson Monument		Windmill Point, George Town, Tasmania	Australia			1935	41°06′35″S 146°49′01″E	Erected to commemorate the 1804 landing of William Paterson (explorer).
Gefallenendenkmal Mühlbach		Mühlbach, Eppingen, Baden-Württemberg	Germany	24	79	1935	49°05′39″N 8°54′20″E	A war memorial, built on a hill above Mühlbach to commemorate the fallen of World War I. It was intended as a gathering place for rallies. In poor structural condition, the site was closed to the public in 2019 and underwent emergency restoration.
Obelisk of Buenos Aires		San Nicolás, Buenos Aires	Argentina	71.5	235	1936	34°36′13″S 58°22′54″W	
Santo Domingo Obelisk		Santo Domingo	Dominican Republic	42	137	1937	18°27′53″N 69°53′38″W	
War Memorial		Floriana	Malta			1938	35°53′37″N 14°30′29″E	
San Jacinto Monument		La Porte, Texas	United States	172.92	567.3	1939	29°45′00″N 95°04′51″W	
Trylon and Perisphere		1939 New York World's Fair, Flushing, New York	United States	190	620	1939	40°44′47″N 73°50′42″W	Not a true obelisk, but an art deco variant.
Maungakiekie Obelisk		One Tree Hill, Auckland	New Zealand			1940	36.900105°S 174.783187°E	
Victory Monument		Bangkok	Thailand			1941	13°45′53″N 100°32′19″E	To commemorate the Thai victory in the Franco-Thai War, a brief conflict waged against the French colonial authorities in Indo-China, which resulted in Thailand annexing some territories in western Cambodia and northern and southern Laos. These were among the territories which the Kingdom of Siam had been forced to cede to France in 1893 and 1904, and patriotic Thais considered them rightfully to belong to Thailand.
Plaza Francia Obelisk		Altamira, Caracas	Venezuela			1944	10°29′47″N 66°50′56″W	
Banská Bystrica Obelisk		Banská Bystrica	Slovakia			1945	48°44′06″N 19°08′41″E	Commemorates the soldiers of the Red Army and those of the Romanian Army who fell while liberating the town.
New Bremm Gestapo Prison Memorial		Saarbrücken	Germany	30	98	1947	49°12′42″N 6°57′53″E	Monument dedicated to the victims of New Bremm Gestapo Prison
Monument to the Fallen		Santa Cruz de Tenerife	Spain	25	82	1947	28°28′0.2″N 16°14′49.6″W	
Cenotaph on Leinster Lawn		Leinster House, Dublin	Ireland	18.28	60.0	1950	53°20′26″N 6°15′14″W	Erected to commemorate the memories of Arthur Griffith, Michael Collins and Kevin O'Higgins; and replaced an earlier temporary cenotaph, erected in 1923.
Lucas Gusher Obelisk		Beaumont, Texas	United States			1951	30°02′01″N 94°04′45″W	Recognizes the 50th anniversary of the birth of the liquid fuel age as the Lucas Gusher came in at Spindletop on January 10, 1901.
Heroes Monument		Surabaya	Indonesia	41.15	135.0	1952	7°14′46″S 112°44′15″E	Commemorate the events of November 10, 1945, at the Battle of Surabaya
1947–1949 Palestine war Memorial		Safed	Israel				32°58′06″N 35°29′44″E	
Obelisk of São Paulo		São Paulo	Brazil	72	236	1954	23°35′5″S 46°39′17″W	
Obelisks outside the Palace of Culture and Science	(South) (North)	Warsaw	Poland	12	39	1955	52°13′50″N 21°00′23″E	Two granite decorative obelisks at the eastern corners of the Palace of Culture and Science complex, a Stalinist-era skyscraper completed in 1955 as a "gift" from the Soviet Union to the people of Poland. The building is one of Warsaw's most iconic and controversial landmarks. Originally there were four, but only two have survived.
Monument to the abolition of slavery (Monumento a la abolición de la esclavitud)		Abolition Park, Ponce	Puerto Rico	30	100	1956	18°00′21″N 66°36′46″W	
Slavin		Bratislava	Slovakia	52.1	171		48°09′14″N 17°05′59″E	
Obelisk of La Paz		La Paz	Bolivia				16°29′55″S 68°08′06″W	
Demidovsky Pillar		Tsentralny City District, Barnaul, Altai Krai	Russia	14	46		53°19′43.8″N 83°47′3.6″E	
Victory Obelisk (Poklonnaya Hill Obelisk)		Poklonnaya Hill, Moscow	Russia	141.8	465	1995	55°43′54″N 37°30′25″E	
The Bayonet-Obelisk of the Brest Hero Fortress War Memorial be:Брэсцкая крэпасць-герой (мемарыяльны комплекс); Штык-абеліск		Brest Fortress, Brest	Belarus	100	330	1971	52°04′58″N 23°39′24″E	A metal framework, titanium-plated obelisk erected in 1971 as part of the Brest Hero-Fortress memorial complex on the 30th anniversary of Victory in the War. It symbolizes the bayonet of a Soviet soldier and the decisive victory over the enemy.
Trinity Nuclear Test Site Obelisk		Jornada del Muerto desert, White Sands Missile Range, near Socorro, New Mexico	United States	12	3.7	1965	33°40′38.23″N 106°28′31.37″W	An obelisk made of black basalt, erected at the site of the world's first atomic bomb explosion on July 16, 1945.
Iglica; The Needle Iglica		Wrocław	Poland	90.3	296	1948	51°06′27.18″N 17°04′30.70″E	A steel spire erected for the Wrocław Exhibition of the Regained Territories. It was originally 106 metres (348 ft) tall, but was shortened in subsequent renovations in 1964–1965 and 1979.
Rugby Center of North America Monument		Junction of U.S. Highway 2 and North Dakota Highway 3, Rugby, North Dakota	United States	6.4	21	1932	48°21′19″N 99°59′57″W	A fieldstone cairn, shaped like a pyramid and resting on a heart-shaped foundation, erected by W.B. and E.B. Paterson to mark Rugby's claim as the geographical center of North America. The claim was based on a 1931 U.S. Geological Survey determination that placed the center in nearby Pierce County. The monument was moved to its present location in 1971 when U.S. Highway 2 was widened.
Pierre Center of North America Obelisk	The Plinth Today The Obelisk when it stood	Snake Butte, approximately 4 miles north of Pierre, Hughes County, South Dakota	United States	7.0	23	1923	44°24′04″N 100°16′44″W	An vanished obelisk erected in 1923 by to mark Pierre's claim as the "Center of North America." The monument was originally placed in the middle what would become US Highway 14 but was moved to the top of Snake Butte in 1928 because of traffic. It was destroyed by 1958, and subsequent replacement markers and plaques have been repeatedly stolen.
The Seven Square Lollipop (Monument commemorating the centenary of National Independence) Pirulito da Praça Sete (Monumento Comemorativo do Centenário da Independência Nacional)		Praça Sete de Setembro, Belo Horizonte, Minas Gerais	Brazil	13.57	44.5	1924	19°55′09″S 43°56′20″W	A granite obelisk commemorating the centenary of Brazil's independence. It was removed from the square in 1962, relocated to Praça Diogo de Vasconcelos in 1963, but returned in 1980 following public pressure. It is colloquially known as the "Pirulito" (lollipop) due to its shape.
Oregon Trail Monuments (Boise)	Example: The E Boise Ave & E Linden St Obelisk	Multiple locations, primarily along Boise Avenue and in the North End, Boise, Idaho	United States	2.1	7	1994–2004		A series of 21 rust-colored steel obelisks, installed over a decade by neighborhood volunteers to mark the historic route of the Oregon Trail through Boise. Each features historic information, a bronze relief medallion of a covered wagon, and maps.
Islamic Summit Minar		Charing Cross (Faisal Chowk), Lahore, Punjab	Pakistan	47	155	1974	31°33′37″N 74°19′30″E	A hexagonal obelisk-like structure built to commemorate the Organisation of Islamic Cooperation (OIC) Summit of 1974, hosted by Prime Minister Bhutto. In 2025, the Punjab Government initiated its restoration.
Luxor Hotel obelisk		Las Vegas Boulevard, Las Vegas, Nevada	United States	140	43	1993	36°05′43.76″N 115°10′23.96″W	A decorative obelisk standing in front of the Luxor Hotel, a pyramid-shaped hotel and casino on the Las Vegas Strip.
National Monument id:Monumen Nasional (Monas/Tugu Monas)		Merdeka Square, Jakarta	Indonesia	132	433	1975	6°10′31″S 106°49′37″E	Obelisk-like structure commissioned by President Sukarno, clad in travertine marble and capped with a gold-leaved bronze flame, symbolizing the Indonesian people's struggle for independence. The design is also intended to evoke the yoni and lingam, representing the 'lesung/alu traditional rice mortar and pestle. The base also contains the National History Museum and Hall of Independence.
Juche Tower (Tower of the Juche Idea) 주체사상탑 (主體思想塔)		Taedong River, eastern bank opposite Kim Il Sung Square, Pyongyang	North Korea	170	560	1982	39°01′03.5″N 125°45′48.1″E	A granite obelisk-like tower capped with an 20 m (66 ft) illuminated torch. Erected in honor of Kim Il-Sung's 70th birthday. It is the tallest granite monument in the world and the second tallest stone monument after the San Jacinto Monument.
Leningrad Hero City Obelisk Обелиск «Городу-герою Ленинграду»		Vosstaniya Square, Saint Petersburg	Russia	36	118	1985	59°55′51.35″N 30°21′42.61″E	A pentahedral, star cross-section, monolithic granite obelisk crowned with a golden star, opened on 8 May 1985 to commemorate the 40th anniversary of the Victory in the Great Patriotic War. It is the highest stone monument in Saint Petersburg after the Alexander Column. It replaced the previous Equestrian Monument to Alexander III.
Minsk Hero City Obelisk Мінск—горад-герой (Стэла)		Pobediteley Avenue 8, Minsk	Belarus	45	148	1985	53°54′57″N 27°32′17″E	An obelisk topped with the Gold Star medal, dedicated to Minsk's designation as a Hero City in 1974. Opened in 1985 to commemorate the 40th anniversary of victory in the Great Patriotic War. Now part of the Belarusian Great Patriotic War Museum complex.
1948 Arab–Israeli War Memorial		Ad Halom, Ashdod	Israel	18	59	1989	31°46′57″N 34°40′09″E	Memorial to Egypt's fallen soldiers, erected as part of the Camp David Accords in exchange for Israel abandoning the Dayan Rock Memorial in the Sinai Peninsula. The inscriptions on the four faces are in Arabic, Hebrew, English and ancient Egyptian hieroglyphs.
Avis Obelisk		Avis Farms Office Park, Pittsfield Township, Michigan	United States			1998	42°12′47.1″N 83°44′45.9″W	Erected near the Ann Arbor Municipal Airport, by Warren Avis, founder of Avis Car Rental outside their first office. The company has since moved it's headquarters.
Bahá'í House of Worship Site Marker		Bahá'í World Centre buildings, Mount Carmel, Haifa	Israel	11	36	1971	32°49′22″N 34°58′32″E	A travertine marble obelisk erected by the Universal House of Justice to mark the future location of a Bahá'í House of Worship on Mount Carmel.
Hero City Monument (Obelisk in honor of the Hero City of Kyiv); Обеліск на честь міста-героя Києва		Halytska Square, Kyiv	Ukraine	30	98	1982	50°26′49″N 30°29′30″E	A white marble obelisk surmounted by a gilded star, erected in 1982 to commemorate Kyiv's title of Hero City. The Soviet star and markings were removed in 2023 during decommunization.
Tomb of the Unknown Soldier ("Memorial of Eternal Glory") Меморіал Вічної Слави		Park of Eternal Glory, Pecherskyi District, Kyiv	Ukraine	27	89	1957	50°26′20.8″N 30°33′11.45″E	A granite obelisk in Eternal Glory Park, Pechersk, unveiled on 6 November 1957. The Eternal Flame was brought from Mamayev Kurgan. The Alley of Fallen Heroes, Ukraine's main military necropolis, leads to the obelisk.
Monument to the Unknown Sailor Пам'ятник невідомому матросові		Taras Shevchenko Central Park of Culture and Recreation, Odesa	Ukraine	21	69	1960	46°28′45″N 30°45′41″E	A red granite obelisk in Shevchenko Park, erected on 9 May 1960 to honour Soviet sailors who died during the 1944 Dnieper–Carpathian Offensive. An eternal flame burns at its foot.
"The Height of Marshal I. S. Konev" National Memorial Complex		Solonytsivka, Kharkiv Oblast	Ukraine	18.6	61	1980 (reconstructed 2003)	50°00′41.9″N 36°02′37.9″E	An obelisk erected at the height where Colonel-General Ivan Konev had his observation point during the 1943 Kharkiv Offensive.
Memorial commemorating the 25th Anniversary of the liberation of Znamianka (Obelisk of Glory) Пам'ятний знак на честь 25-ї річниці визволення міста Знам'янка (Обеліск Слави)		Znamianka, Kirovohrad Oblast	Ukraine	14	46	1968	48°42′00″N 32°40′00″E	An obelisk commemorating the 25th anniversary of Liberation, and installed above a military mass grave. In 2022 the monument was renovated, having its Soviet symbols removed and being repainted with the Ukrainian flag.
Monument to Soviet Soldiers-Liberators (Пам'ятник радянським воїнам-визволителям)		Kropyvnytskyi, Kirovohrad Oblast	Ukraine			1960	48°30′49.22″N 32°15′35.95″E	A Soviet-era obelisk commemorating the soldiers who liberated the city during the Second World War. Listed as a monument of local significance in Ukraine (protection number 35-101-0591).
Monument to the Defenders of the Fatherland Пам'ятник Захисникам Вітчизни		Pivdenne, Odesa Oblast	Ukraine			1968	46°37′25″N 31°06′04″E	A Soviet-era obelisk commemorating the fallen of the Second World War in the town of Pivdenne (formerly Yuzhne). Erected in 1968.
Obelisk of the Hero City of Odesa ("Wings of Victory") Обеліск місту-герою Одесі («Крила Перемоги»)		10 April Square (Площа 10 Квітня), Primorskyi district, Odesa	Ukraine	36	118	1984	46°26′25″N 30°45′25″E	A gray marble obelisk installed commemorating the 40th anniversary of the city's liberation. It is topped with a gold star and features memorial plaques with the names of Odesa's Heroes of the Soviet Union. The monument was renovated in 2020.
Independence Monument		Maha Bandula Park, Yangon	Myanmar	42.72	140	1948	16°46′23.3″N 96°09′34.2″E	A white obelisk surrounded by two concentric circles of chinthe (mythical lion-dragon deities), erected to commemorate Myanmar's independence from British rule, replacing a statue of Queen Victoria erected 1896.
Bonifacio Monument		Caloocan	Philippines	13.7	45	1933	14°39′19.8″N 120°59′05.6″E	A national landmark designed by National Artist Guillermo Tolentino, featuring a 45-foot granite obelisk topped with a winged figure of Victory.
Penang Overseas Chinese Anti-War Memorial		Air Itam, Penang	Malaysia	14.9	49	1951	5°24′04.7″N 100°17′11.0″E	A whitewashed obelisk commemorating the Chinese people of Penang who died during the Japanese occupation in World War II. It is believed to be the tallest of its kind in the world.
Mexico Memorial Tower 日西墨三国交通発祥記念之碑		Onjuku, Chiba	Japan	17	56	1928	35°11′30″N 140°22′07″E	A giant concrete obelisk commemorating the exchange between Japan, Spain, and Mexico, marking the site where a Spanish shipwreck occurred in 1609.
Whangārei Second World War memorial		Mount Parihaka, Whangārei, Northland	New Zealand			1947	35°43′07″S 174°19′47″E	A distinctive Second World War memorial obelisk, notable for its stainless steel sheathing and four red Christian crosses, one on each side.
Reefton War Memorial Obelisk		Reefton, West Coast	New Zealand			1920s	42°07′00″S 171°52′00″E	A square obelisk built in the early 1920s to memorialize those from the Inangahua district who died in World War One.
Monument to Ohta Kyozaburu (Ohta Kyozaburo Monument)		Bago Oshiro, Barangay Mintal, Davao City	Philippines			1926	7°05′38″N 125°30′01″E	A stone obelisk built to honor Japanese businessman Ohta Kyozaburo (1876–1917), "Father of Davao Development". The monument is located within the grounds of the former Japanese school (now Mintal Public School) in Bago Oshiro, Mintal—an area once known as "Little Tokyo." One of the few remaining pre-war structures of Davao's once-thriving Japanese community
State War Memorial Cenotaph		Kings Park, Perth, Western Australia	Australia	18	59	1929	31°57′41″S 115°50′05″E	A granite obelisk designed by General Sir J. Talbot Hobbs as honorary architect, to commemorate Western Australian servicemen and women who died in all wars and conflicts. It is a near-replica of the AIF Memorials in France and Belgium, with an undercroft listing subsequent conflicts.

=== 21st century ===
Obelisk name	Image	Location	Country	Elevation		Completed	Coordinates	Notes
Obelisk name	Image	Location	Country	m	ft	Completed	Coordinates	Notes
The Monument of Light; The Millennium Spire; Spire of Dublin ga:An Túr Solais; Spuaic Bhaile Átha Cliath		O'Connell Street, Dublin	Ireland	121.2	398	21 January 2003	53°20′59″N 6°15′37″W	A stainless‑steel needle topped with a beacon, designed by Ian Ritchie Architects and engineered by Arup, and erected on the site of the former Nelson's Pillar which was destroyed by the IRA in 1966. It was intended to celebrate the third millennium and to anchor the urban renewal of O’Connell Street. The monument was fabricated in eight sections, the first of which was installed on 18 December 2002, the final on 21 January 2003.
Capas National Shrine tl:Pambansang Dambana ng Capas		Barangay Aranguren, Capas, Tarlac	Philippines	70	230	9 April 2003	15°20′56″N 120°32′43″E	A black obelisk, the centrepiece of a 54‑hectare memorial park on the site of the former Camp O'Donnell prisoner-of-war camp, commemorating the Bataan Death March, and commissioned by President Corazon Aquino on 7 December 1991. It is divided into three sections symbolizing the Filipino, American, and Japanese peoples, and is surrounded by a three‑segmented black marble wall inscribed with the names of over 30,000 Filipino and American soldiers who died during the march.
Kolonna Eterna (Eternal Column) The Millennium Monument Mt:Monument tal-Millennju		Triq il-Kappella, San Gwann, Northern Region	Malta	6	20	27 February 2003	35°54′36.2″N 14°28′36.2″E	A ceramic obelisk, designed by Maltese artist Paul Vella Critien commemorating the new millennium. It was inaugurated by Prime Minister Eddie Fenech Adami. Its abstract form resembles an Egyptian obelisk pointing to the sky as a symbol of eternity, though it has also been widely noted for its phallic appearance.
Colonna Mediterranea (The Mediterranean column) (aka) The Luqa Monument Mt:Il-Monument ta' Ħal Luqa		Luqa roundabout, Malta	Malta	3.0	10	2006	35°51′37.58″N 14°29′2.35″E	A controversial ceramic obelisk designed by Maltese artist Paul Vella Critien, installed on a roundabout at the entrance to Luqa. Intended as a modern 3D "Egyptian symbol" representing the colours of the Mediterranean. It has proved controversial due to its phallic appearance, suffering calls for removal in 2010 and vandalism in 2012. It was restored in 2013.
Cyclisk		1255 Santa Rosa Avenue, Santa Rosa, California	United States	20	65	2010	38°25′35″N 122°42′49″W	An Egyptian-style obelisk made from approximately 340 recycled bicycles and one tricycle. Commissioned by the City of Santa Rosa, funded by Nissan, and created by Mark Grieve and Ilana Spector. There is some concern about whether the obelisk will remain on the site following the land's sale.
Obelisco Novecento the Twentieth-century Obelisk It:Monumento al Novecento		Piazzale Pier Luigi Nervi, EUR district, Rome	Italy	21	69	23 October 2004	41°49′23″N 12°27′55″E	Not a true obelisk, rather a bronze conical sculpture, situated in a fountain pool, by Arnaldo Pomodoro, and commissioned by the City of Rome for the 2000 Jubilee. Its form is meant to represent the complexities and contradictions of the 20th century (Novecento).
Armed Forces Memorial Obelisk		RBL National Remembrance Gardens, near Alrewas, Lichfield, Staffordshire	United Kingdom	12	40	12 October 2007	52°43′38.64″N 1°43′40.44″W	A Portland stone obelisk tipped with gold, located at the north-eastern edge of a six-metre-high earth mound measuring 100 metres wide at the base and 50 metres at the top, as part of the larger memorial complex. Designed by architect Liam O'Connor with bronze sculptures by Ian Rank-Broadley, the memorial was dedicated by Queen Elizabeth II. The memorial commemorates over 16,000 service personnel who have died on duty or through terrorist action since the end of the Second World War.
Jiujiang Victory Monument ("The Pencil Tower") 九江胜利碑 / 胜利塔 ("铅笔塔")		Victory Park, Bali Lake New Area, Jiujiang, Jiangxi 江西省 九江市 八里湖新区 胜利公园	China	200.6	658	2007	29°41′45″N 115°56′53″E	A a square cross-section reinforced concrete tube-in-tube structure with an elevator, clad in stone and glass, with a viewing platform at the summit which can hold 60 people. Believed to be the tallest obelisk of this type in the world, surpassing the Washington Monument in height. It commemorates significant historical events in Jiujiang: the return of the British concession in 1927, the planning of the Nanchang Uprising, victory in the Battle of Wanjialing, the Yangtze River Crossing campaign during the Chinese War of Liberation, and success fighting the floods in 1998.
Caja Madrid Obelisk es:Obelisco de Caja Madrid		Plaza de Castilla, Madrid, Community of Madrid	Spain	92	302	23 December 2009	40°27′58″N 3°41′22″W	A bronze and steel obelisk designed by Santiago Calatrava and inaugurated by King Juan Carlos I, commemorating the 300th Anniversary of the founding of the Caja Madrid Bank. The inner core is a cylindrical metal shaft 2 metres (6.6 ft) in diameter, clad in 462 gold-plated bronze ribs which were designed to rotate hydraulically in a helicoidal motion, though they stopped spinning after only a month due to maintenance issues.
The Colony Park Monument a.k.a. The Washington Monument Cell Phone Tower		Colony Park, Ridgeland, Mississippi	United States	57.91	190.0	2008	32°26′49″N 90°08′47″W	A cell-phone signal tower designed to resemble the Washington Monument. It was built by Colony Park developer H.C. Bailey, who selected the site for optimal antenna reception, but needed to be moved in 2021 due to a road project. The actual building of the tower was completed by Jones Hardscapes.
Olalla Washington Monument Replica		Private property near Anderson Point Park, Olalla, Kitsap County, Washington	United States	17	55	2004	47°25′50″N 122°32′40″W	A plywood obelisk, built as an exact replica of the Washington Monument by master carpenter Stan Ohman (d. 2022) for his son Pete Ohman. Constructed over 4,000 hours, the obelisk weighs approximately 3 tons and features an interior ladder allowing access to the top.
Broken Lantern Fi:Särkynyt lyhty		Nordbergin möljä, Tornio, Lapland	Finland	9	30	23 November 2013	65°50′47″N 24°09′09″E	An illuminated steel, scrap metal and glass obelisk incorporating a moonshine still and parts from a local brewery, designed by fi:Pekka and Teija Isorätty and assembled by Torstec Oy. The monument is dedicated to fi:Kalkkimaan Pappi and punk band Terveet Kädet.
Mausoleum of António Agostinho Neto (MAAN) "The Space Rocket" pt:Memorial Dr. António Agostinho Neto "Foguetão"		Praia do Bispo, Luanda	Angola	120	390	17 September 2012	8°49′25″S 13°13′08″E	A concrete obelisk, constructed in memory of Agostinho Neto, communist revolutionary and first president of Angola. Commissioned in the 1980s, designed by the Soviets, and begun in 1982, construction stalled as the Soviet Union Fell. Construction resumed in 2005 in partnership with the DPRK and the memorial was inaugurated on (what would have been) Dr. Neto's 90th Birthday in 2012. The complex also includes a museum, library, galleries, and a sarcophagus containing Neto's remains. It was the tallest building in Luanda until 2018.
Oregon World War II Memorial		Oregon State Capitol grounds, Willson Park, Salem, Oregon	United States	10	33	6 June 2014	44°56′22.2″N 123°01′58.9″W	An obelisk dedicated on the 70th Anniversary of D-Day, to honor Oregon's World War II Veterans. The height, 33 feet, is symbolic of Oregon's entry into the USA as the 33rd State.
The Human Rights Monument Fr: Monument aux Droits de l'Homme Nl: Monument voor de Mensenrechten		Tour & Taxis Park, City of Brussels, Brussels-Capital Region	Belgium	12	39	10 December 2018	50°52′07.79″N 4°20′40.42″E	Obelisk, commemorating the 70th Anniversary of the Universal Declaration of Human Rights, constructed of 30 differently coloured stones representing and displaying each of the articles in French, Dutch, German and English. The stones range from dark at the base to light at the top, symbolising the diversity of human rights and cultures.
Macquarie Pier Foundation Obelisk		Macquarie Pier, near Nobbys Head, Newcastle, New South Wales	Australia	2	6.6	5 August 2018	32°55′20.94″S 151°47′34.06″E	A small sandstone obelisk commemorating the 200th Anniversary of Governor Lachlan Macquarie laying the foundation stone for Macquarie Pier (the Newcastle breakwater) on 5 August 1818. The original foundation stone is currently lost (probably 7 meters underground) but has been subject of decades of both official and amateur search. The modern obelisk stands near the current path along the breakwater.
The New Obelisk at Slottsbacken sv:Obelisken i Stockholm		Slottsbacken, Gamla stan, Stockholm	Sweden	30	98	Erected 2020	59°19′33.12″N 18°04′17.42″E	Replacement for the old obelisk at Slottsbacken (erected 1800), which by 2012 was irreparably damaged. The original was dismantled in 2017, the new shaft was then assembled between April and June 2020. Constructed of Bohus granite. The monument is dedicated to the bourgeoisie and their defense of the city during the Russo-Swedish War of 1788-1890.

== See also ==
- Menhir: Neolithic, european standing monoliths, generally singular
- Napakivi: Finnish standing stones, generally monoliths.
- Obelisk
- Stele: A category of standing stone monument - generally with carvings or writing. These were erected for many different reasons throughout the world.
- Victory column: Monumental columns erected after a military victory - also quite cosmopolitan in their distribution.
- Pillory: In the English speaking world these were generally not particularly monumental, however in Europe (particularly on the Iberian Peninsula, and subsequently, the New World), these often took the form of columns, obelisks, or simlilar shaped structures (e.g. pt:Pelourinho, Picota, de:Gerichtssäule and de:Pranger, fr:Rollo jurisdiccional), and were a source of civic pride as they indicated township had been achieved.
