= List of obelisks =

For Lists of obelisks, see:

- List of Egyptian obelisks
- List of modern obelisks
- List of obelisks in Rome
