= Obelisk (Prague Castle) =

Obelisk in Prague, Czech Republic

- Obelisk na Pražském hradě (Czech)
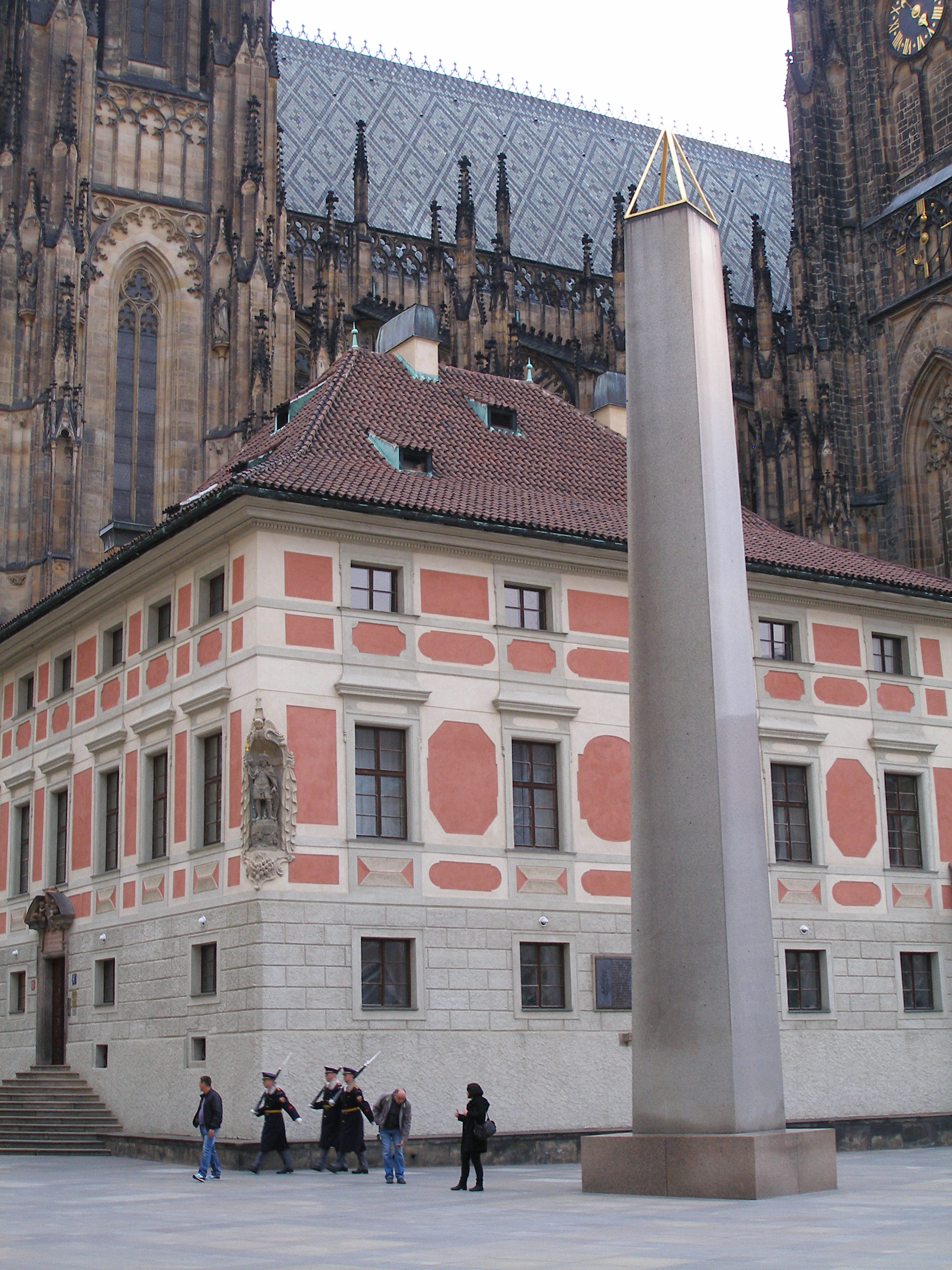
- The obelisk in 2012
- Artist: Jože Plečnik
- Location: Prague, Czech Republic; 50.0902°N 14.4001°E

The obelisk at Prague Castle (Czech: Obelisk na Pražském hradě or Mrákotínský monolit) is a granite monolith and World War I memorial designed by Jože Plečnik, installed at Prague Castle in Prague, Czech Republic. It stands 16 meters high. It is located in the Third Castle Courtyard.

The obelisk was donated by Tomáš Garrigue Masaryk. It was erected in late 1928 to mark the tenth anniversary of the establishment of the First Czechoslovak Republic. The obelisk was originally to have been much larger, but while it was being transported to its intended location in 1928, it broke in two, and only part could be salvaged.
