= Umberslade Hall =

Country house in Tanworth-in-Arden, Warwickshire, England

Coordinates: 52°20′24″N 01°48′04″W

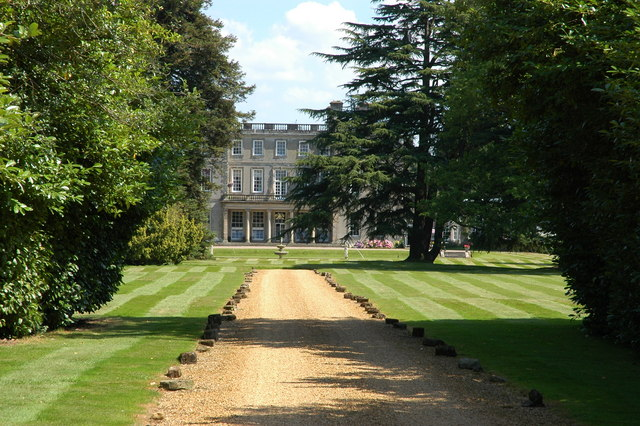

Umberslade Hall is a 17th-century mansion converted into residential apartments situated in Nuthurst near Tanworth-in-Arden, Warwickshire. It is a Grade II* listed building.

The Archer family were granted the manor of Umberslade by Henry II in the 12th century and retained possession for some 600 years.

The old manor house was replaced between 1695 and 1700 when Smith of Warwick built the new mansion for Andrew Archer, Member of Parliament for Warwickshire. The estate passed to his son Andrew Archer, 2nd Baron Archer, after whose death in 1778 it was ultimately settled on his daughter Sarah, Countess of Plymouth. In 1751 Horace Walpole visited the estate and called it an odious place.

The estate was sold in 1826 to Edward Bolton King, Member of Parliament for Warwick and for the County of Warwick, during whose time the ancient chapel at Nuthurst, near Hockley Heath was rebuilt and land was given for a church and school at Hockley Heath. From 1850 the house was leased by George Frederic Muntz, Member of Parliament for Birmingham. After his death in 1857 his son George Frederick bought the estate and much enlarged and improved the Hall. During this time Muntz junior had a church built on the estate, Umberslade Baptist Church, which exists to this day separately to the Hall. In 1881 the household comprised thirty including thirteen resident servants. Frederick Ernest Muntz who succeeded to the estate in 1898 served as High Sheriff of Warwickshire in 1902 and as Deputy Lieutenant. The estate, much reduced, remains in the ownership of the Muntz family.

From the 1960s the Hall was leased out to commercial tenants, including from 1967 BSA Motorcycles – Triumph Motorcycles, to merge their various design and development departments at a central point, roughly equi-distant from their manufacturing bases at Meriden, Redditch and Small Heath. The companies motorcycle design output during this time wasn't universally popular or successful and the site was given the nickname "Slumberglade" by the factory workers and others. Previously, the site had been similarly used by an industrial manufacturer of car components, Wilmot Breedon.

In 1978, it was converted into twelve apartments and two mews cottages.

== See also ==
- Umberslade Obelisk
