= Umberslade Obelisk =

Obelisk in Warwickshire, England

Coordinates: 52.3423°N 1.7880°W

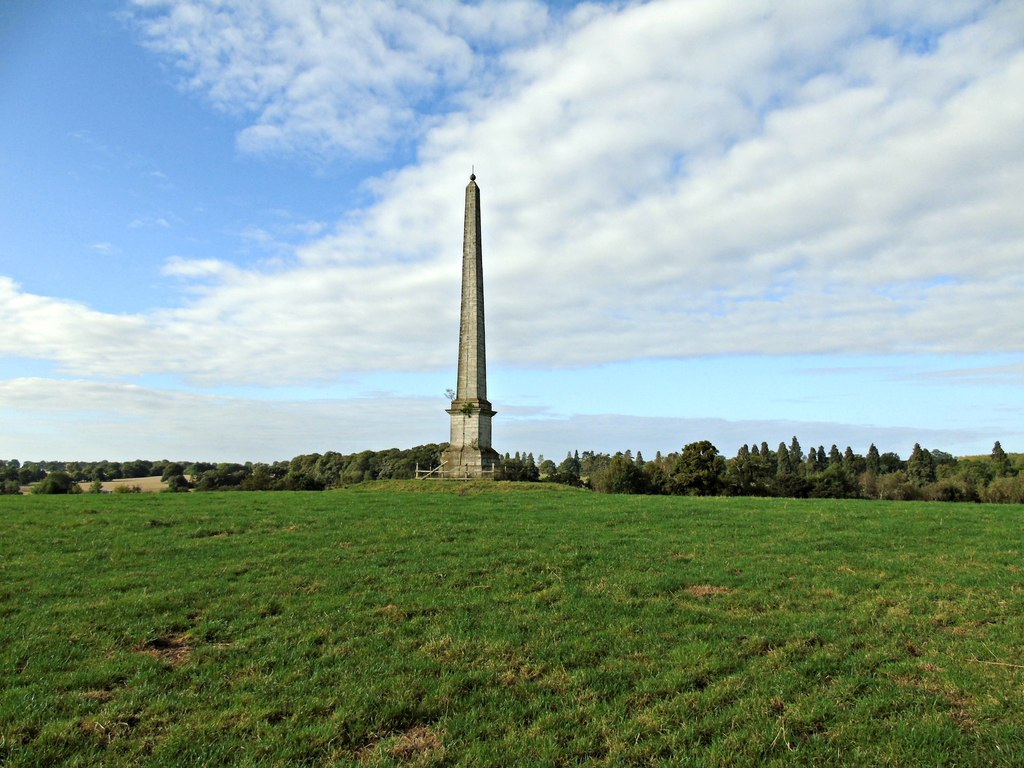
Umberslade Obelisk

The Umberslade Obelisk is a Grade II listed monument in Warwickshire, England constructed by order of Thomas Archer, 1st Baron Archer, on his estate of Umberslade Hall in 1749. The obelisk is constructed from grey limestone and stands 70 ft (21 m) tall. The reason for its construction is unknown, but it may have simply been to enhance the view from the hall windows. The obelisk lies near the M40 motorway.

== History ==
The obelisk was constructed in 1749 by Thomas Archer, 1st Baron Archer, who owned the nearby Umberslade Hall. It seems to have been constructed during a period of re-landscaping of the parkland around Umberslade Hall. The more formal 17th-century-style park, which included several smaller obelisks near to the hall, was replaced in the mid-18th century in a more naturalistic style. The obelisk was built by William Hiorne of Warwick.

There is no record of the reason for its construction; in 1905, the historian William Holden Hutton described it as "Lord Archer's monument of nothing in particular". It is possible that it commemorates Archer's elevation to the peerage (as Baron Archer of Umberslade) in July 1747. It has also been proposed that it marks the defeat of the 1745–46 Jacobite rising as Archer was a prominent member of the Whig party who opposed the rising. Other claims are that it marks the meeting place of the last coven of witches in Warwickshire or a nearby gospel tree, a place of informal Christian worship, said to date to the Norman Conquest. The construction came at a time when the erection of obelisks was popular on English country estates and the purpose of the monument may simply be to enhance the view from Umberslade Hall. It is placed so as to be prominently visible from the windows of the hall.

The clergyman and writer William Field describes it as "a fine Obelisk, which forms a striking object from the windows of the house" in his 1815 book An Historical and Descriptive Account of the Town and Castle of Warwick and of the Neighbouring Spa of Leamington and, shortly after construction, Henrietta Knight, Lady Luxborough, was invited to the hall specifically to view the obelisk from its windows. Travel writer Fanny Parkes noted in 1850 that the obelisk "leans fearfully".

== Description ==
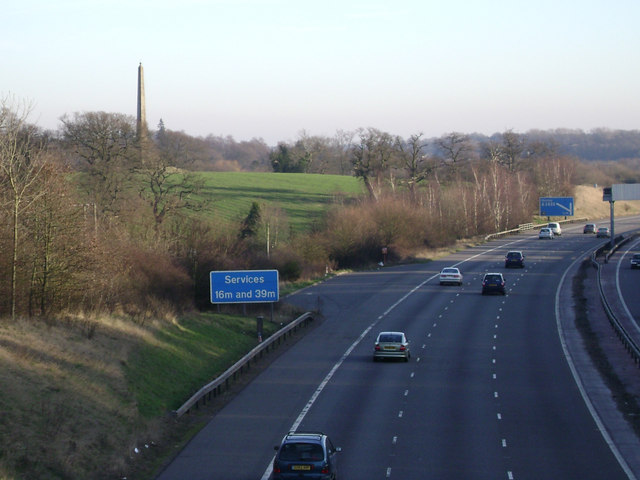
The obelisk and the M40

The obelisk is made from grey limestone ashlar and is square in cross section. The 70 ft (21 m) obelisk sits atop a two-tier stepped square plinth with a moulded cornice on the upper tier. There is no inscription on the plinth. At the top of the obelisk is a stone ball finial, which was originally gilded, and a metal spike, to which was originally affixed a copper eight-armed cross (which has also been described as a star).

The monument is a Grade II listed structure and the listing notes that it is to be considered in context with the nearby Obelisk Farmhouse, which is also Grade II listed. Though originally a focal point of the view from the hall the setting of the obelisk has been adversely affected by the planting of a group of conifers as part of the construction of the M40 motorway in the late 1980s.
