= Dover Patrol Monument =

War memorials in the UK, US, and France

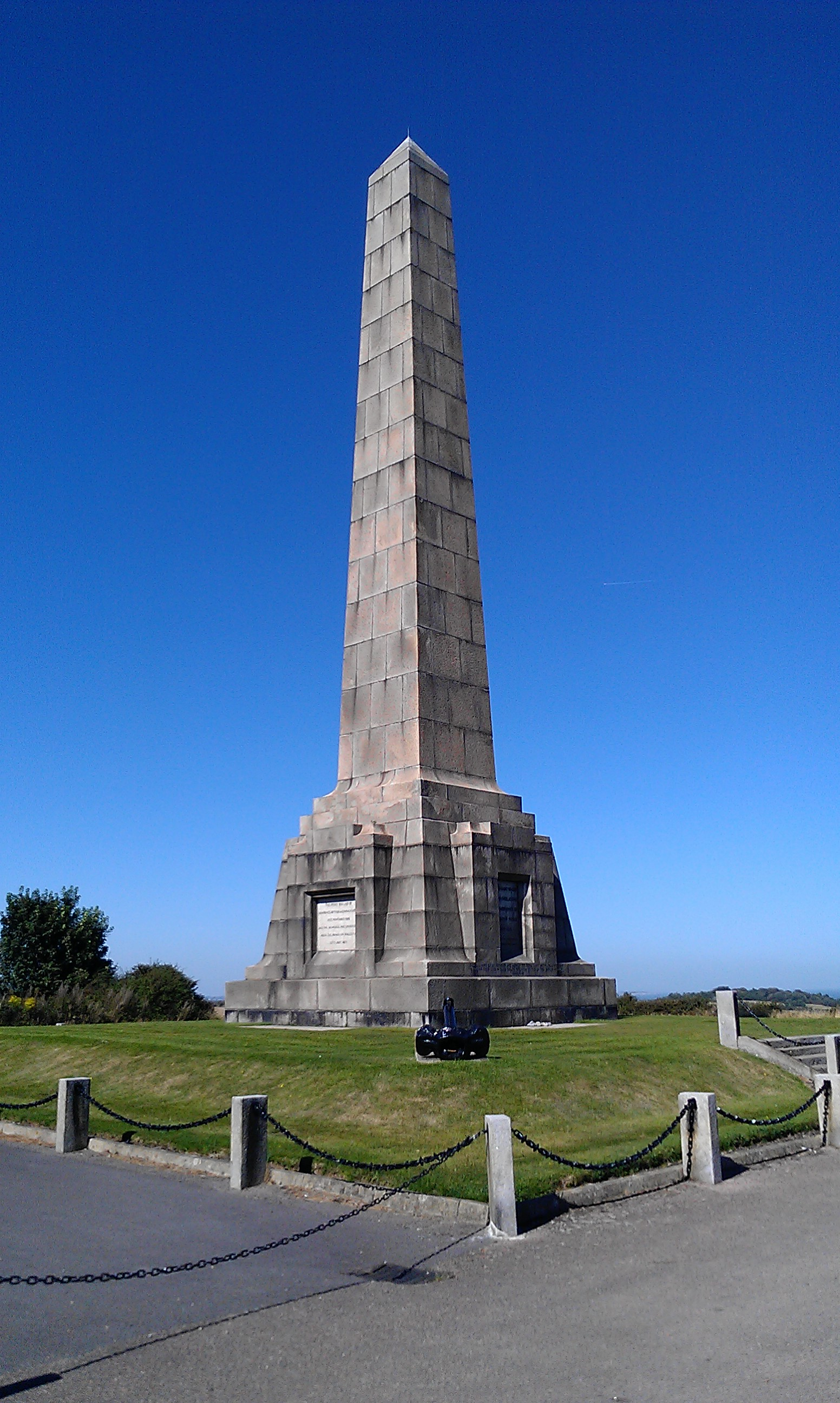
Memorial near Dover

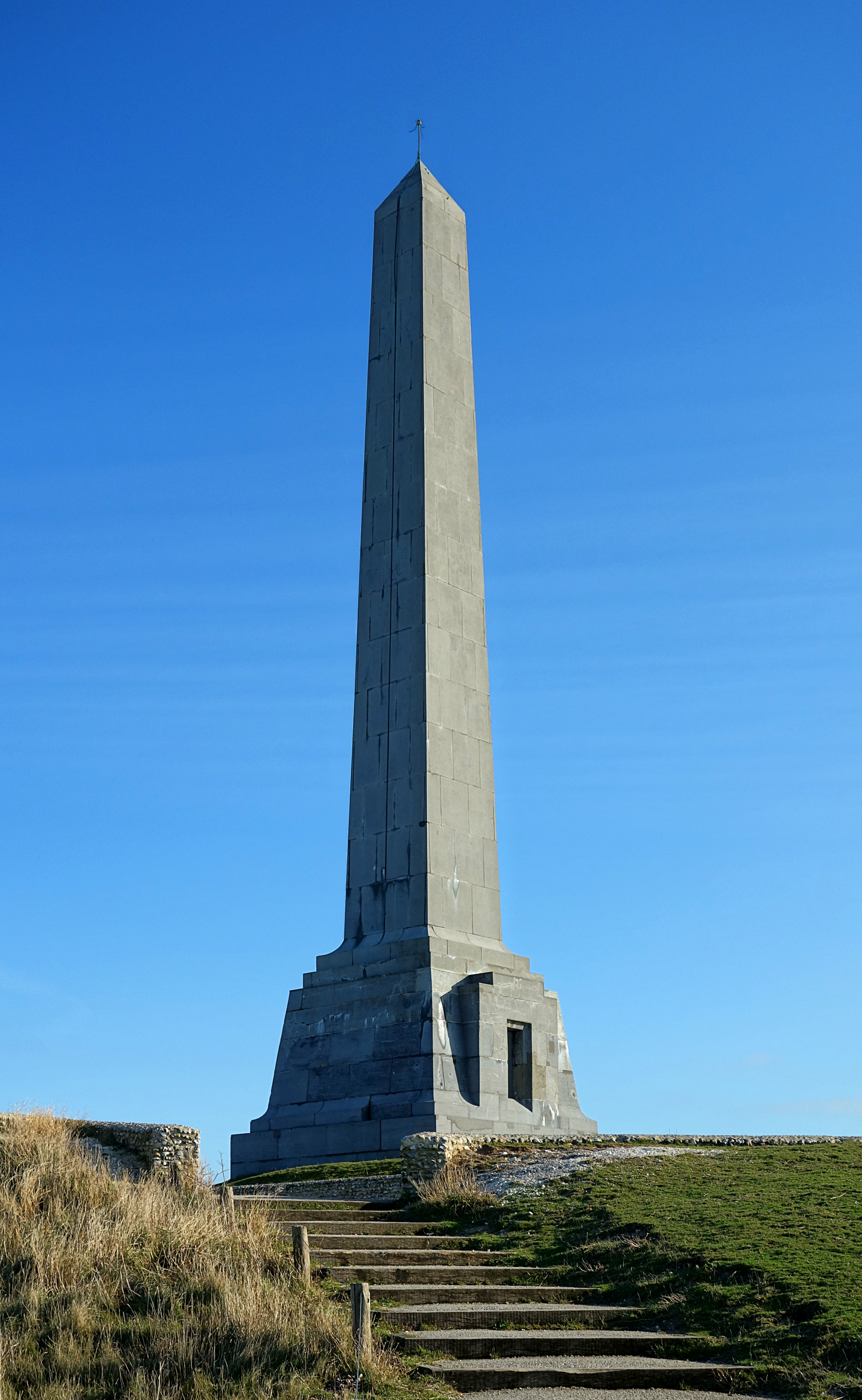
Memorial near Calais

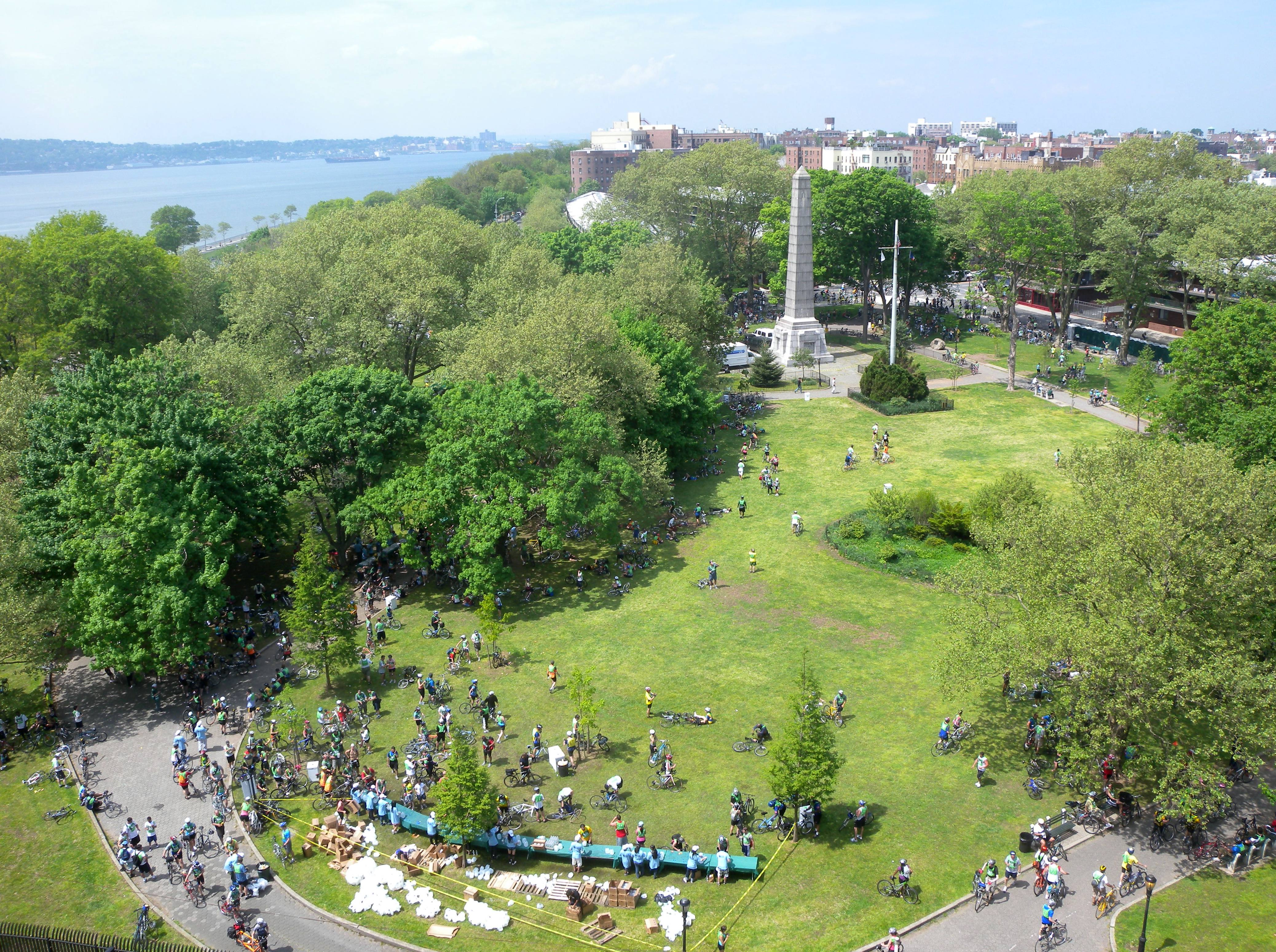
Memorial in John Paul Jones Park, Brooklyn, New York

The Dover Patrol Monuments are a trio of war memorials designed by Sir Aston Webb to commemorate the Royal Navy's Dover Patrol of the First World War. Two identical granite memorial obelisks, 75 feet (23 m) high, were erected near Dover and on the Cap Blanc-Nez near Calais in 1921 and 1922. A third was erected in Brooklyn, New York, in 1931. The UK monument became a Grade II listed building in August 1966, promoted to Grade II* in August 2015.

== Background ==
The Dover Patrol was formed in July 1914, around a nucleus of the 12 Tribal class destroyers. Through the First World War, a variety of craft served in the patrol—cruisers, destroyers old and new, submarines, mine-sweepers, armed trawlers and drifters, armed yachts, motor launches and other coastal craft—as well as a variety of aircraft - flying boats, aeroplanes, and airships. From time to time, French destroyers were included in the patrol.

The patrol covered the southern part of the North Sea and the eastern portion of the English Channel, including the Straits of Dover. Its duties included escorting merchant ships, hospital ships and troop transports; anti-submarine patrols; sweeping for German mines, and laying British minefields and anti-submarine nets; and bombarding German land forces on the coast of Belgium and northern France. It was commanded by Admiral Reginald Bacon from 1914 until his retirement at the end of 1917, and then by Vice-Admiral Roger Keyes. Six members of the patrol were awarded the Victoria Cross in a single action on 22–23 April 1918, for their part in the Zeebrugge Raid to block the entrance to the port of Bruges-Zeebrugge and so prevent German vessels from leaving port.

Some 2,000 members of the patrol lost their lives during the war. A committee was formed in November 1918 to raise a public subscription for the erection of a monument in memory of the patrol. Over £45,000 was raised, including £1,000 donated by King Albert and Queen Elizabeth of the Belgians.

== Description ==
A granite memorial obelisk was designed by Sir Aston Webb, perhaps better known as the designer of Admiralty Arch, the Victoria Memorial on the Mall, and the façade of Buckingham Palace, all in London. Three obelisks were erected, the first at Leathercote Point to the east of St Margaret's Bay at St Margaret's at Cliffe near Dover, on land donated by Granville Leveson-Gower, 3rd Earl Granville; a second at Cap Blanc Nez near Sangatte in northern France; and a third in New York City.

The monument has an air of Egyptian architecture. It comprises a 75 feet (23 m) high obelisk of square section constructed from large granite blocks, with a pyramidal top. The obelisk stands on a tall stone plinth, which flares out onto a square base. Three sides of the base have a frame of ashlar blocks around an inscription.

== Dover memorial ==
The first stone of the memorial near Dover (51°09′25″N 1°23′34″E) was laid by Prince Arthur of Connaught on 19 November 1919. The completed monument was unveiled by the Prince of Wales on 27 July 1921. On both occasions a dedication was led by Harold Bilbrough, the Suffragan Bishop of Dover.

The south-western side is inscribed "THIS STONE WAS LAID BY / H.R.H. PRINCE ARTHUR OF CONNAUGHT, K.G. / 19TH NOVEMBER 1919 / AND THE MEMORIAL WAS UNVEILED BY / H.R.H. THE PRINCE OF WALES, K.G. / 27TH JULY 1921."

The north-western unframed side is inscribed "THIS MONUMENT / TO THE / DOVER PATROL / WAS ERECTED IN THE YEARS 1920 & 1921 BY / PUBLIC SUBSCRIPTION TOGETHER WITH THOSE / AT CAP BLANC NEZ, FRANCE / AND NEW YORK HARBOUR, / AMERICA. / THE NAMES OF THOSE WHO GAVE THEIR LIVES SERVING THEIR KING / AND COUNTRY IN THE DOVER PATROL ARE RECORDED IN THE BOOK OF / REMEMBRANCE IN THE TOWN HALL, DOVER, A COPY OF WHICH IS KEPT / AT THE PARISH CHURCH, ST MARGARETS AT CLIFFE".

The south-eastern side of the monument is inscribed "TO THE GLORY OF GOD / AND IN EVERLASTING / REMEMBRANCE OF / THE DOVER PATROL / 1914 - 1919 / THEY DIED THAT WE MIGHT LIVE / MAY WE BE WORTHY OF THEIR SACRIFICE / TO THE MEMORY OF THE OFFICERS AND MEN OF THE ROYAL NAVY AND MERCHANT NAVY / WHO GAVE THEIR LIVES IN SHIPS SAILING UPON THE WATERS OF THE DOVER STRAIT / 1939 - 1946".

A Book of Remembrance listing nearly the names of 2,000 war dead from the Dover Patrol is held at St Margaret's Church, near the monument.

A Coastguard Station was erected nearby, and a radar station during the Second World War.

The monument became a Grade II listed building in August 1966, promoted to Grade II* in August 2015.

== Calais memorial ==
A second obelisk (50°55′29″N 1°42′36″E) stands on top of Cap Blanc Nez near Sangatte in the Pas-de-Calais. Part of the inscription is in French, which claims that the monument was inaugurated by Flaminius Raiberti (the then minister of the French Navy) on 20 July 1922). It also claims that the first stone was laid by Maréchal Foch on 28 January 1920.

The memorial was blown up during the occupation and rebuilt in 1962. There are German bunkers in the cliffside. The memorial was designed by Leon de Keyser (an architect from Ghent) and built by Martiny of Brussels.

The memorial was renovated in 2007 as part of the renewal of the Grand Site de France Les Deux-Caps.

Near the monument there is also a monument dedicated to Hubert Latham.

== New York memorial ==
A third obelisk (40°36′41″N 74°02′03″W) was erected near the Verrazzano–Narrows Bridge in John Paul Jones Park in Brooklyn, New York, in 1931. Inscriptions on the New York memorial read: "THIS MONUMENT / TO THE DOVER PATROL / ERECTED AS A TRIBUTE TO THE / COMRADSHIP AND SERVICE OF THE / AMERICAN NAVAL FORCES / IN EUROPE / DURING THE WORLD WAR. / MONUMENTS OF IDENTICAL DESIGN AT / DOVER ENGLAND – CAP BLANC NEZ FRANCE – NEW YORK, NY. / ERECTED FROM FUNDS PROVIDED BY PUBLIC SUBSCRIPTION / IN GREAT BRITAIN" and then: "TO THE GLORY OF GOD / AND IN EVERLASTING / REMEMBRANCE OF / THE DOVER PATROL / 1914–1919 / THEY DIED THAT WE MIGHT LIVE / MAY WE BE / WORTHY OF THEIR SACRIFICE" and the date "1931".

The New York memorial was recently named a "WWI Centennial Memorial" after being enter in the 100 Cities – 100 Memorials competition.

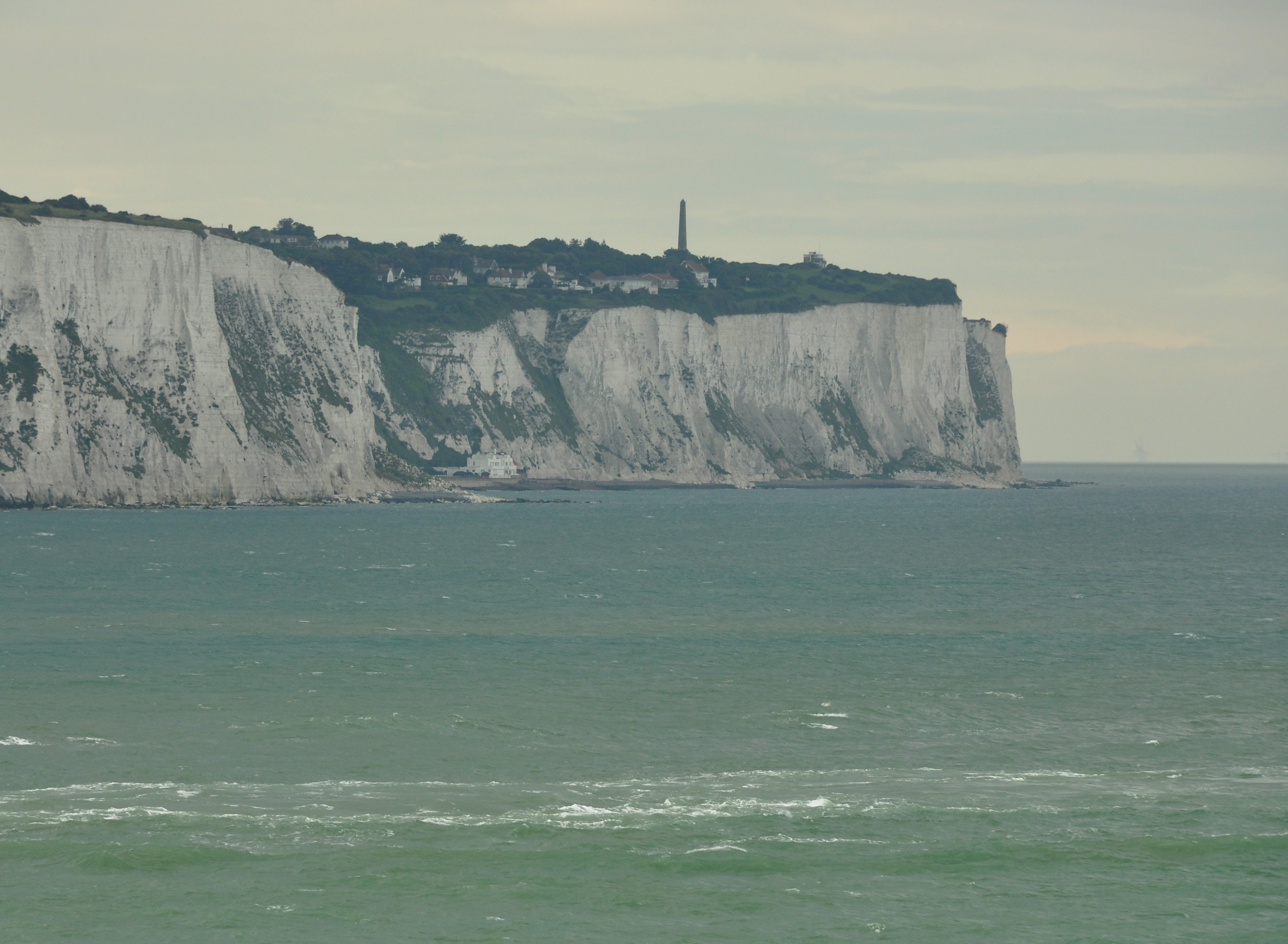
View of the memorial on the cliffs near Dover

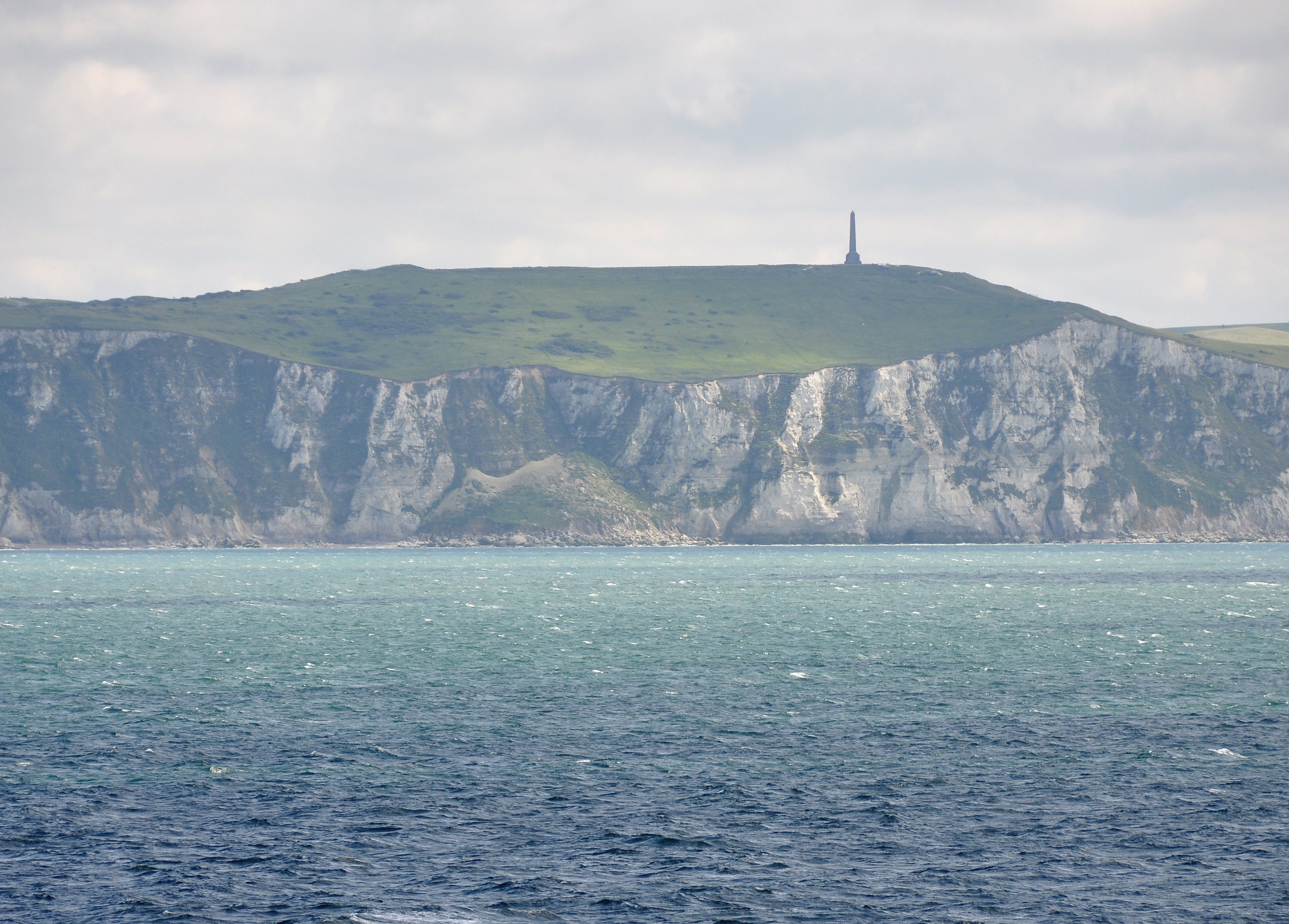
View of the memorial on the cliffs near Calais

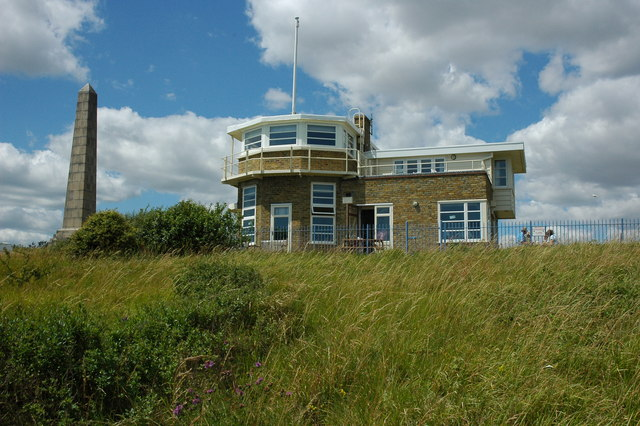
Former Coastguard Station beside the monument near Dover

== See also ==
- Grade II* listed war memorials in England
