= Cap Blanc-Nez =

Cape in Pas-de-Calais, France

Coordinates: 50°55′30″N 1°42′34″E

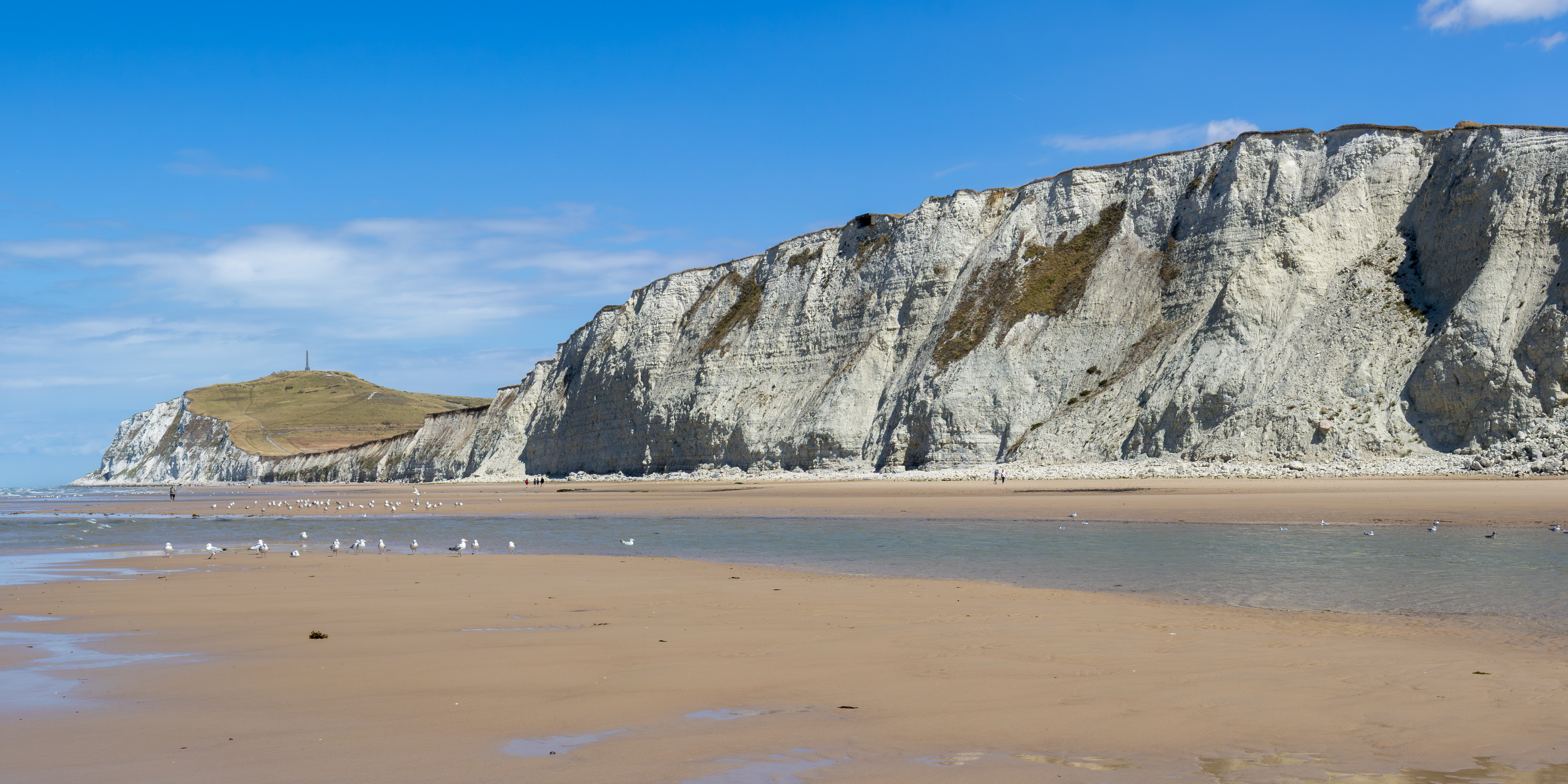
View of the beach at low tide

Aerial view

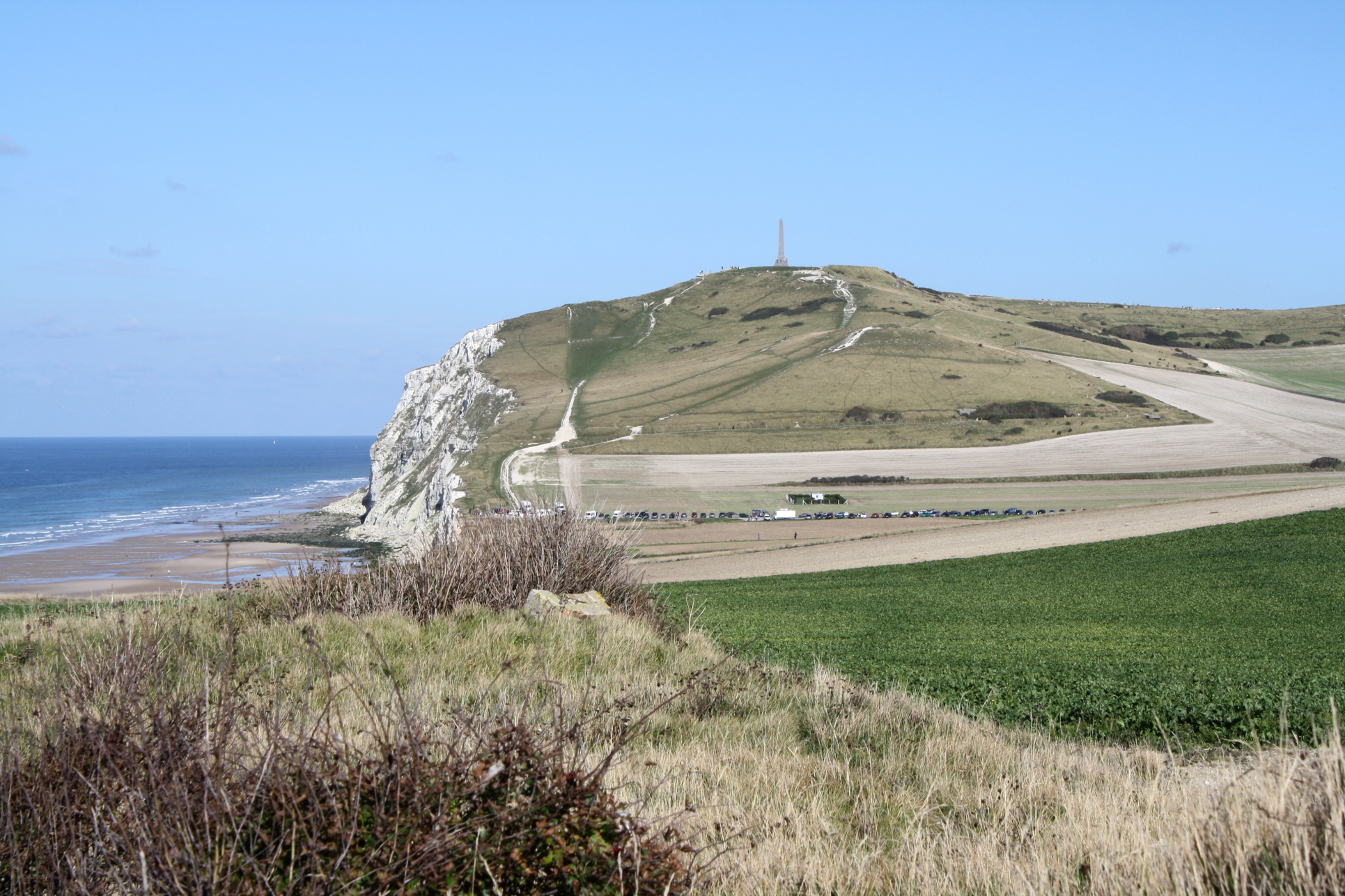
Cap Blanc Nez on a summer day

Cap Blanc-Nez (French pronunciation: [kap blɑ̃ ne], literally "Cape White Nose" in English; from Dutch Blankenesse, white headland) is a cape on the Côte d'Opale, in the Pas-de-Calais département, in northern France, culminating at 134 m. The cliffs of chalk are very similar to the white cliffs of Dover on the other side of the Channel in England. Cap Blanc-Nez does not protrude into the sea like a typical cape but is a high point where a chalk ridge has been truncated by the sea, forming a cliff that is topped by the obelisk of the Dover Patrol Monument, commemorating the Dover Patrol which kept the Channel free from U-boats during World War I.

Cap Blanc-Nez was a vital measuring point for the eighteenth-century trigonometric survey linking the Paris Observatory with the Royal Greenwich Observatory. Sightings were made across the English Channel to Dover Castle and Fairlight Down on the South Downs. This Anglo-French Survey was led in England by General William Roy.

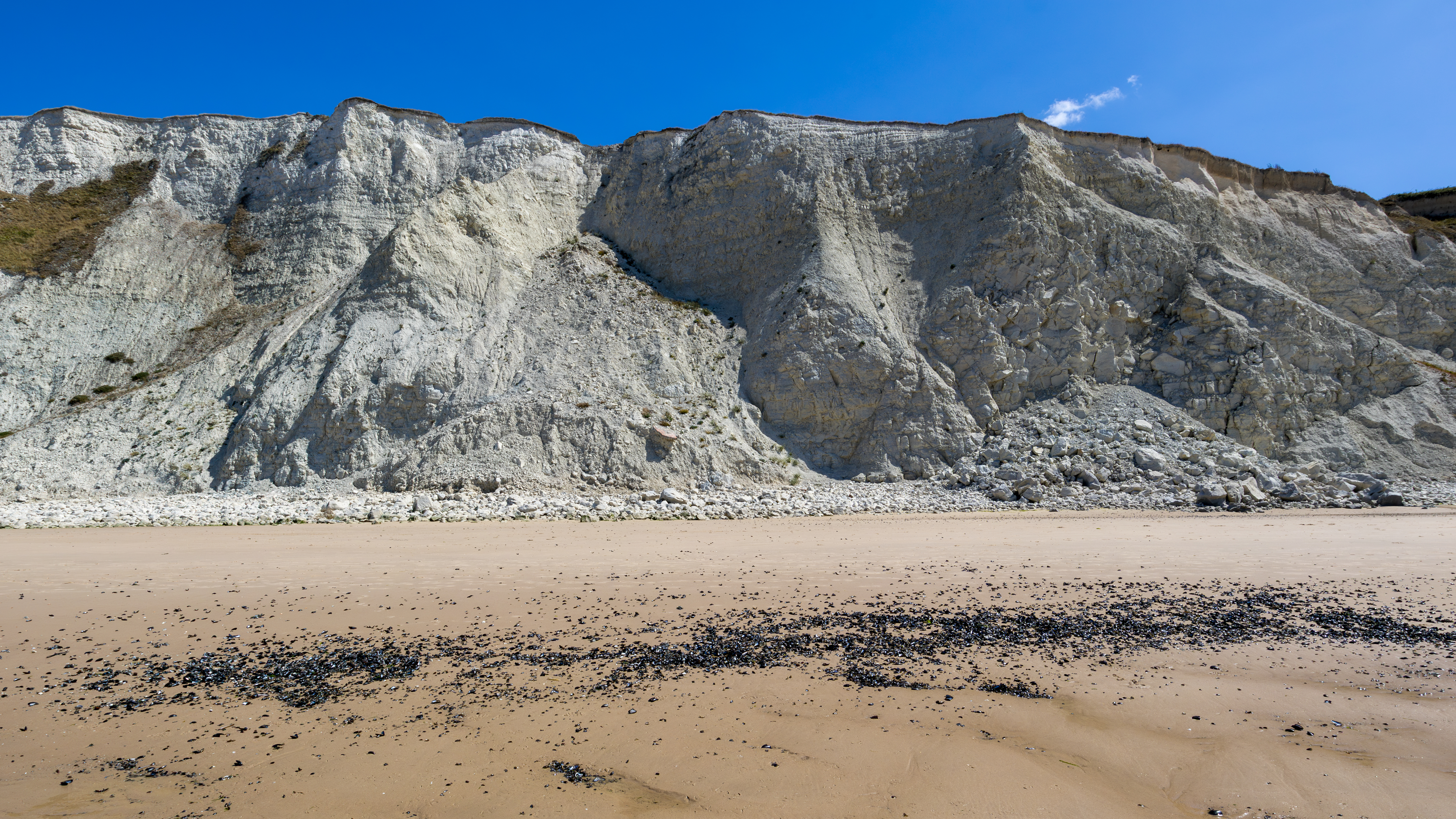
The chalk cliff

Cap Gris-Nez is 10 miles southwest of Cap Blanc-Nez. The water between the two capes is called the Bay of Wissant, the beach the Plage de Wissant, both near the village Wissant.
