= Snake Butte (South Dakota) =

National Natural Landmark in South Dakota

- Interactive map of Snake Butte
- Location: Oglala Lakota Nation, Jackson County, South Dakota, United States
- Coordinates: 43°26′06″N 101°54′01″W
- Established: National Natural Landmark

U.S. National Natural Landmark
- Designated: 1967

Snake Butte is a section of a butte formation in Jackson County, South Dakota, United States. The site is also called Rattlesnake Butte and Devil's Hill. A 4-acre portion of this site was listed in 1967 as a National Natural Landmark, further defined as a place of geological interest. The site is located within the trust lands of the Oglala Lakota Nation in southwestern South Dakota.

== Description ==
The United States National Park Service describes Snake Butte:

Illustrates one of two types of sand calcite deposits in the world.
