= Plaza Salcedo =

Plaza Salcedo in Vigan, Ilocos Sur

Coordinates: 17°34′31″N 120°23′15″E

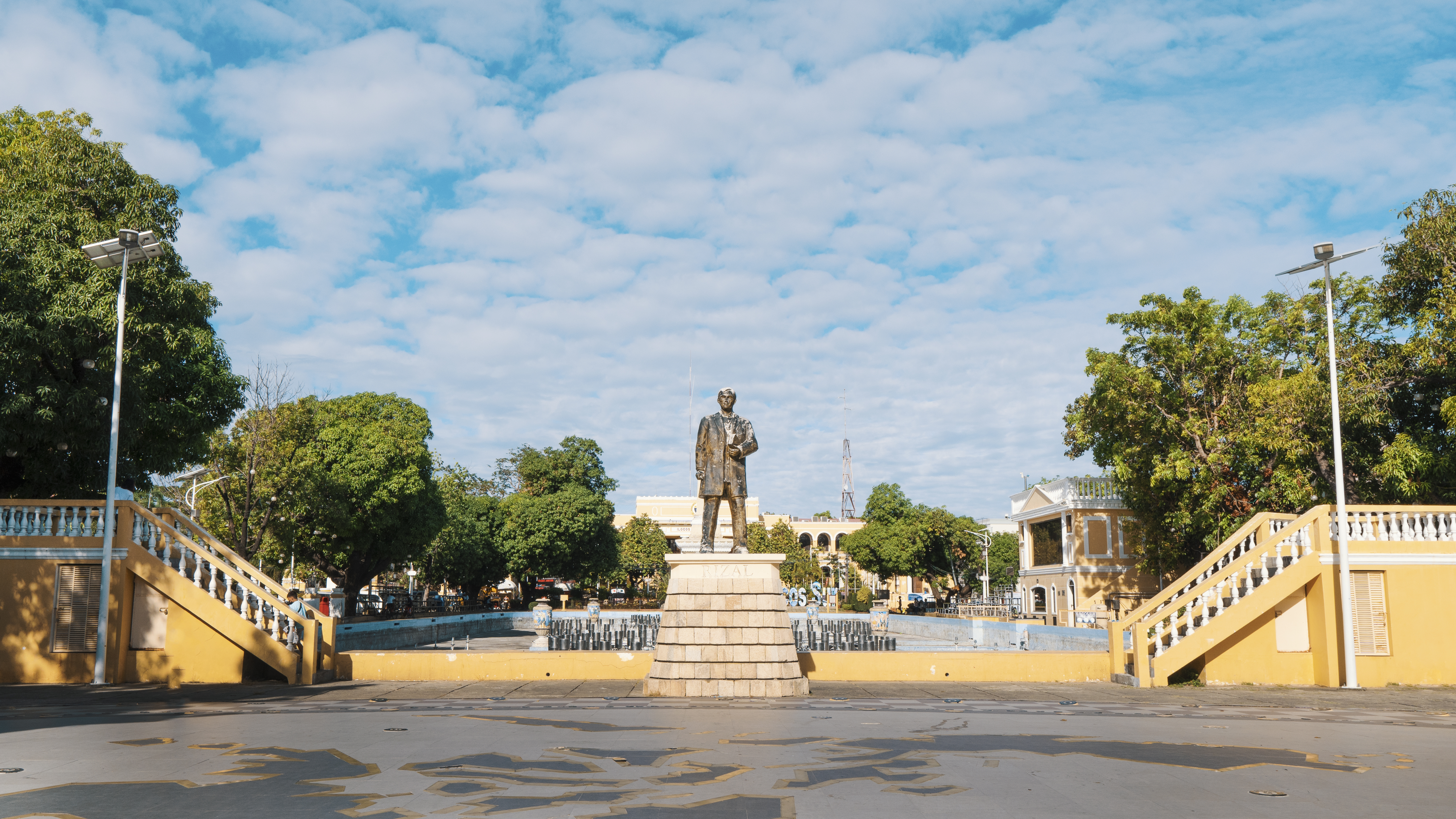
- Interactive map of Plaza Salcedo
- Location: Vigan, Ilocos Sur, Philippines

Plaza Salcedo is a public park in Vigan, Ilocos Sur, Philippines. The park is the longer arm of an L-shaped open space (the shorter arm of the L being the Plaza Burgos) where a popular dancing fountain display is located. Named after the Spanish conquistador Juan de Salcedo, Plaza Salcedo is the city's town center and is known for being the execution site of Filipina revolutionary Gabriela Silang in September 1873. The plaza contains, in its center, an obelisk, erected during the 17th century. The lagoon surrounding the obelisk was created during the 1970s to store water for use during times of fire, which was especially common in the then-municipality in the preceding decades.

== Gallery ==
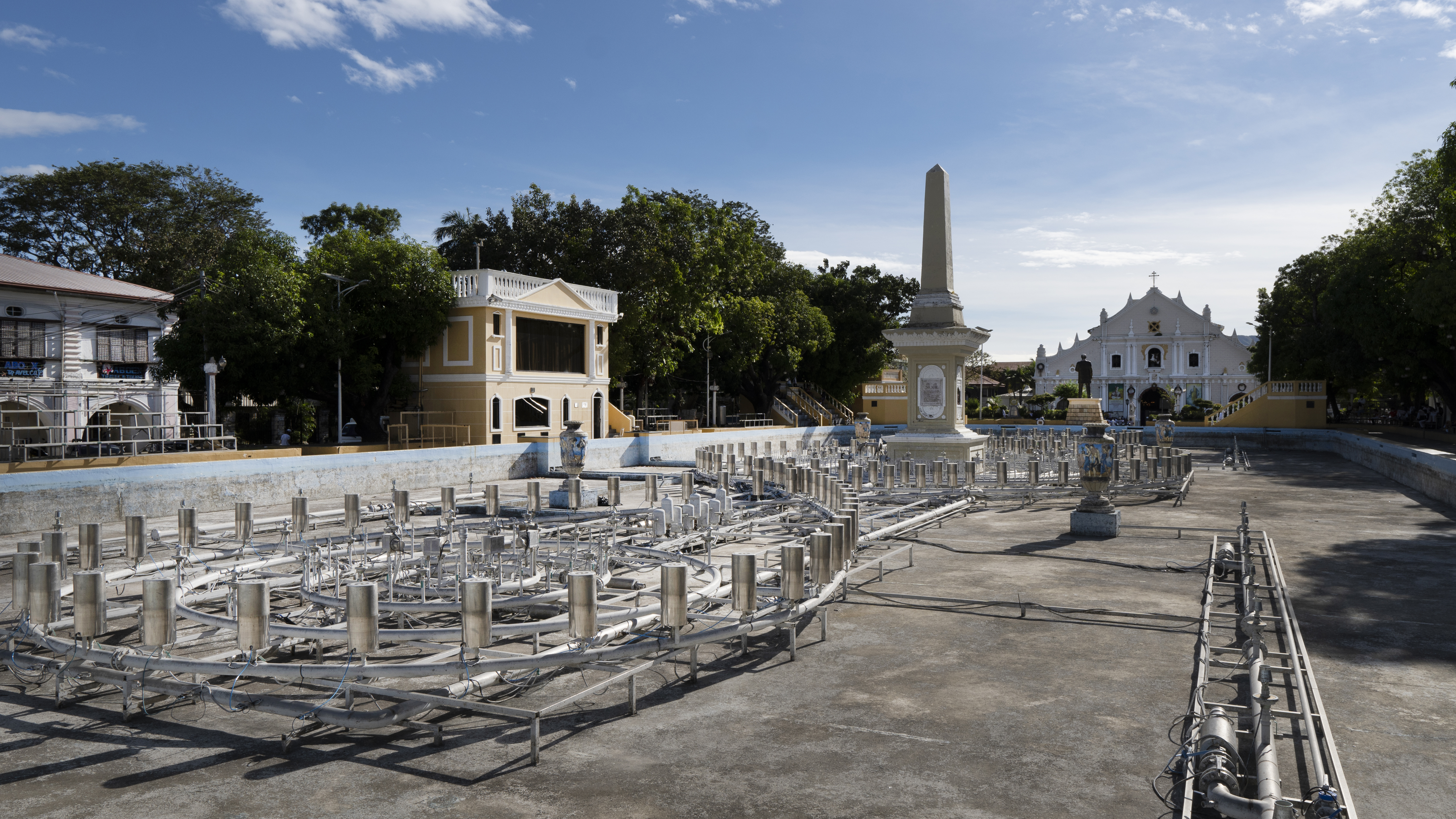
Fountains with the Salcedo obelisk and the Vigan Cathedral in the background

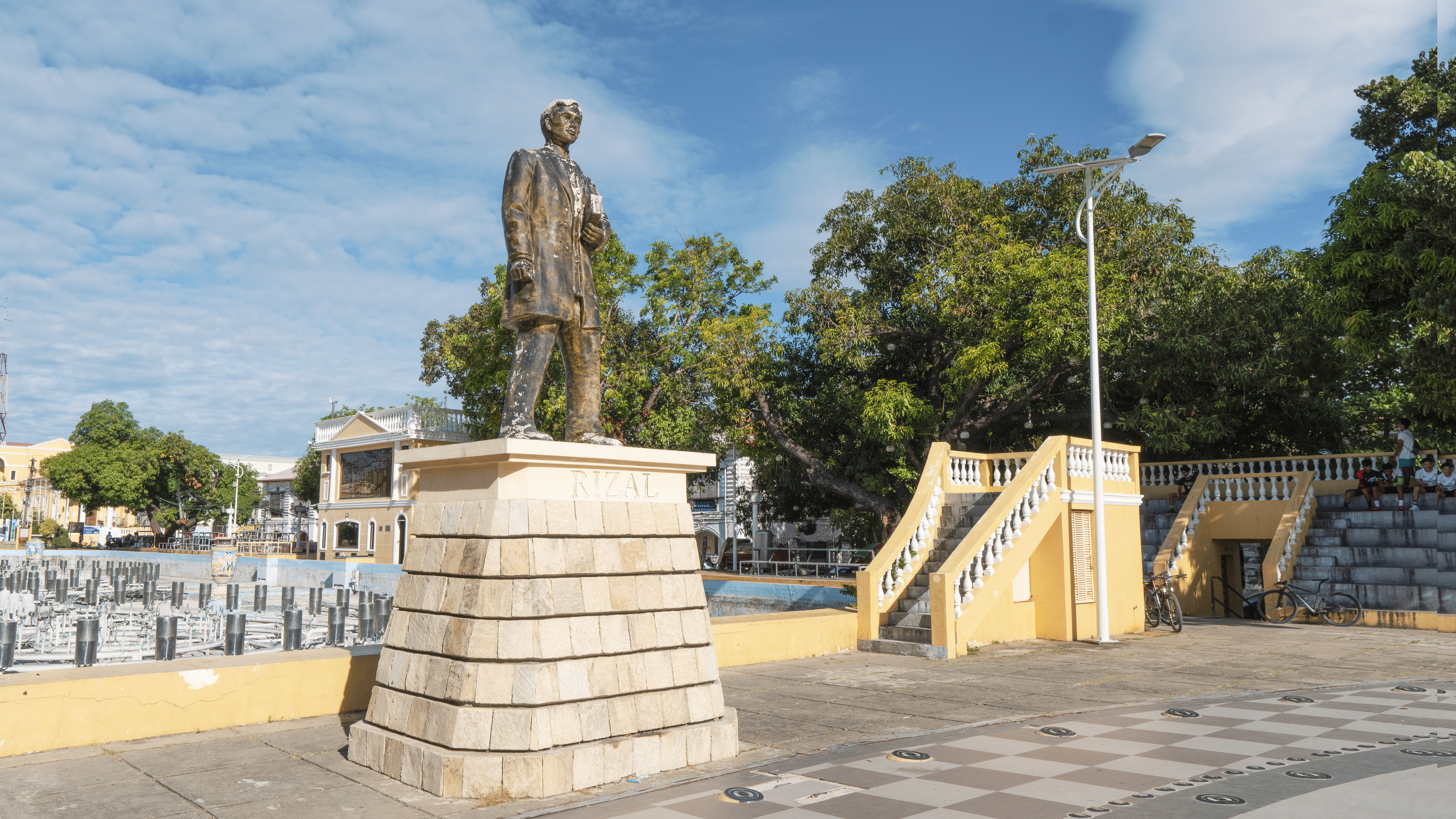
José Rizal statue

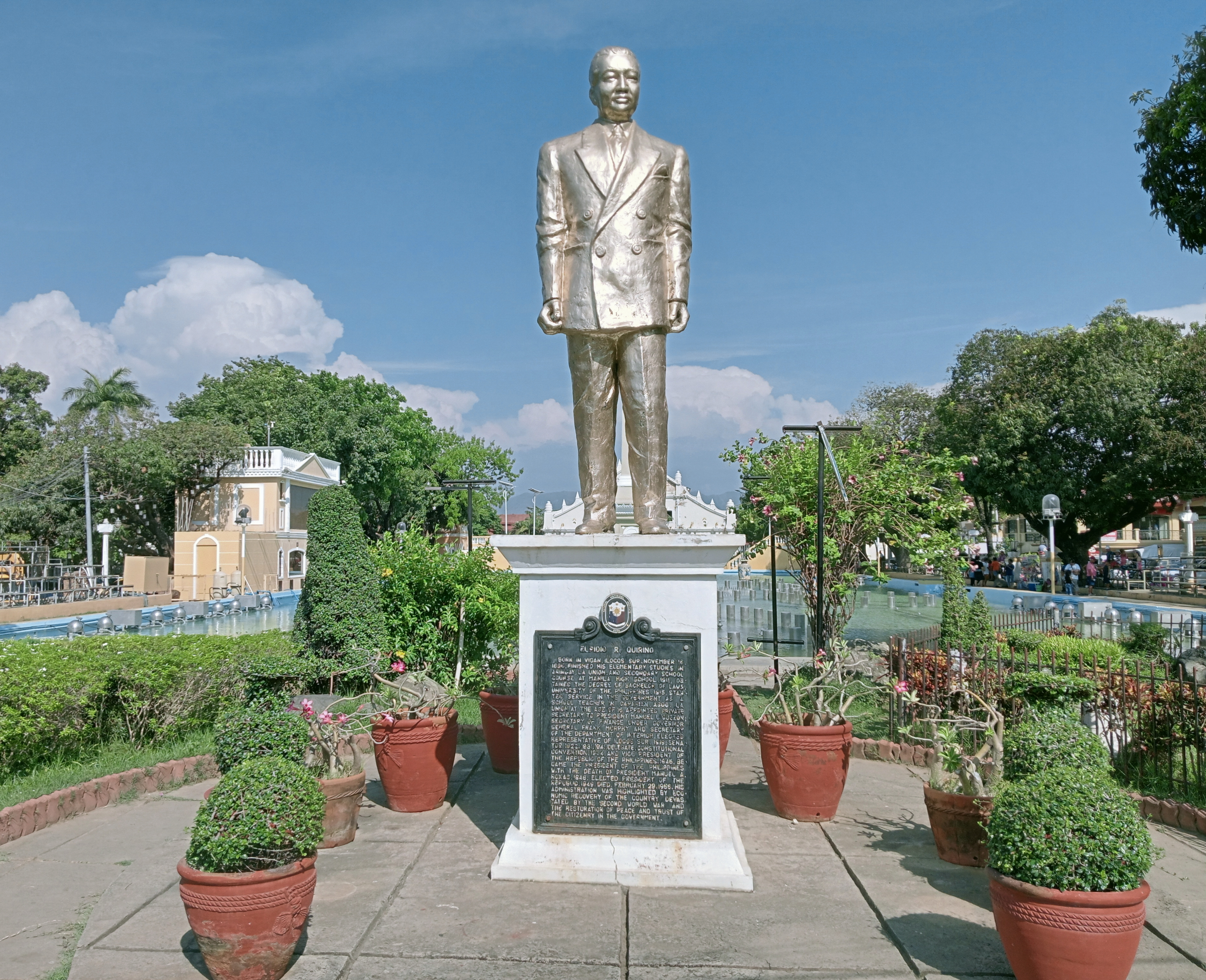
Elpidio Quirino statue

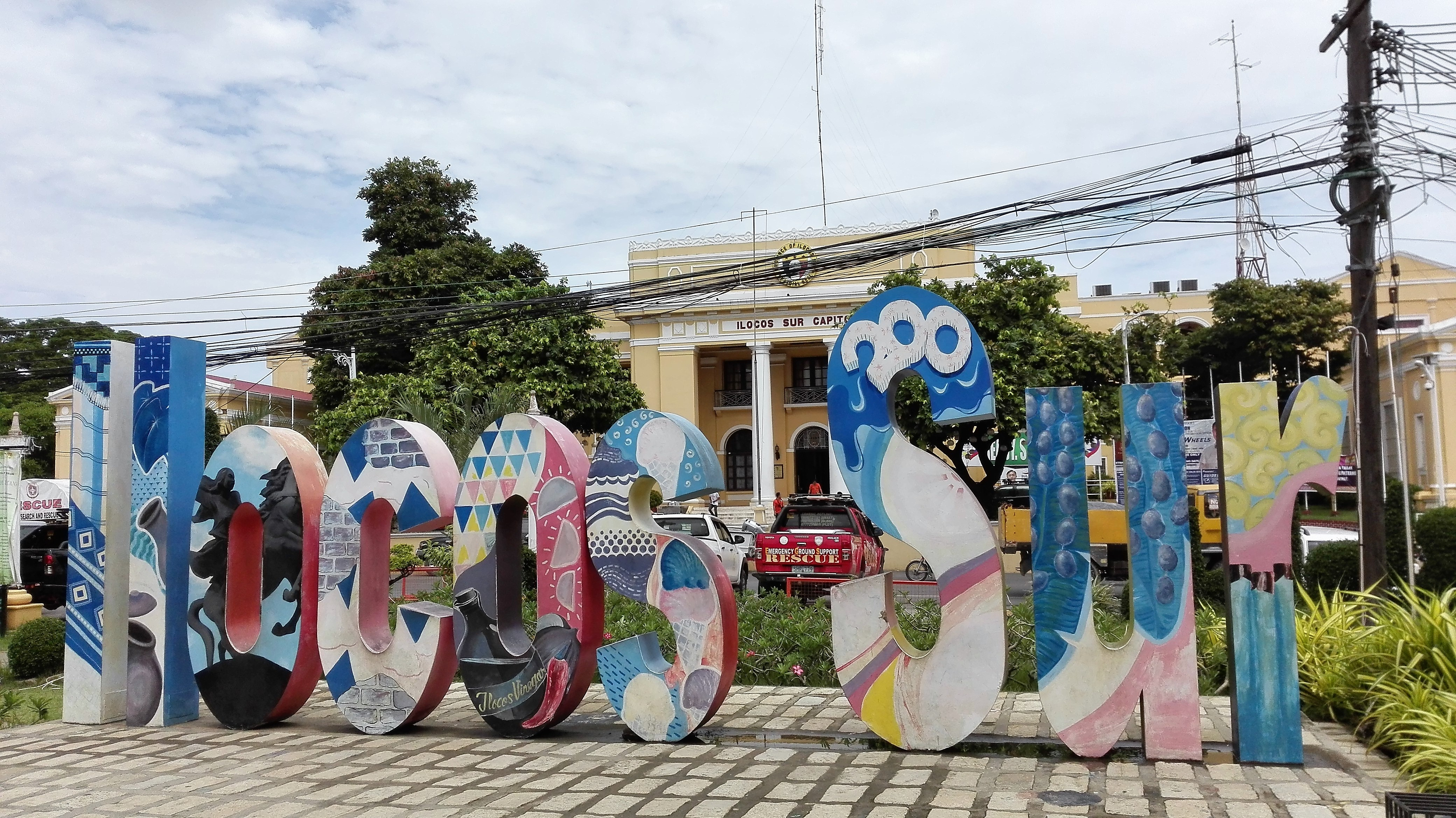
Ilocos Sur sign with the provincial capitol building in the background

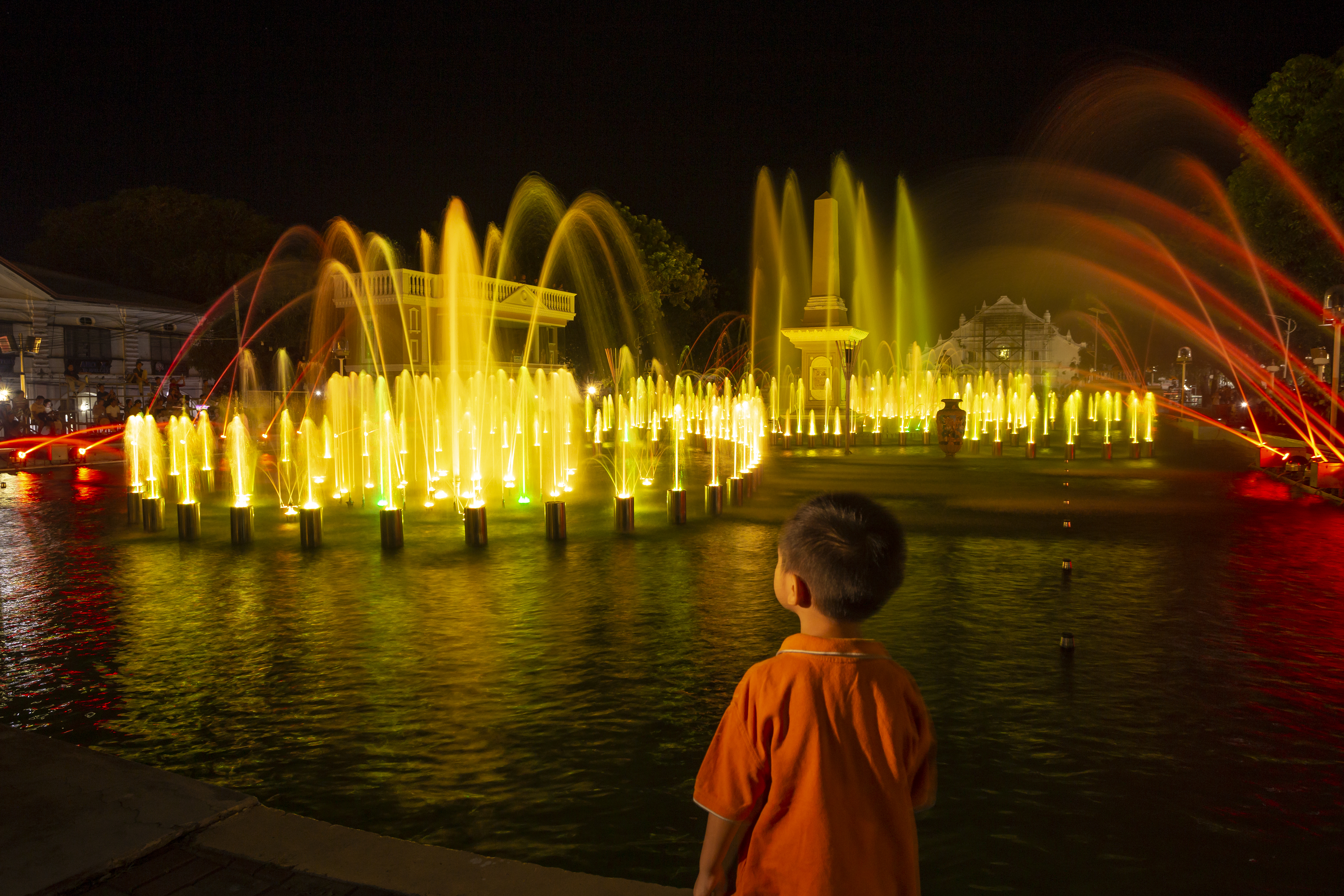
Dancing fountain at night
