= Sete de Setembro (disambiguation) =

Sete de Setembro is the Independence Day of Brazil.

Sete de Setembro may also refer to:

== Places ==
- Sete de Setembro, Rio Grande do Sul, Brazil
- Sete de Setembro River, a river in Mato Grosso, Brazil
- Avenida Sete de Setembro, a road in Salvador, Bahia, Brazil
- Praça Sete de Setembro, a square in Belo Horizonte, Minas Gerais, Brazil

== Other uses ==
- Clube Desportivo Sete de Setembro, an association football team in Dourados, Mato Grosso do Sul, Brazil
- Sete de Setembro Esporte Clube, an association football team in Garanhuns, Pernambuco, Brazil
- Brazilian ironclad Sete de Setembro, a wooden-hulled warship
