= Edmar Bacha =

Brazilian economist

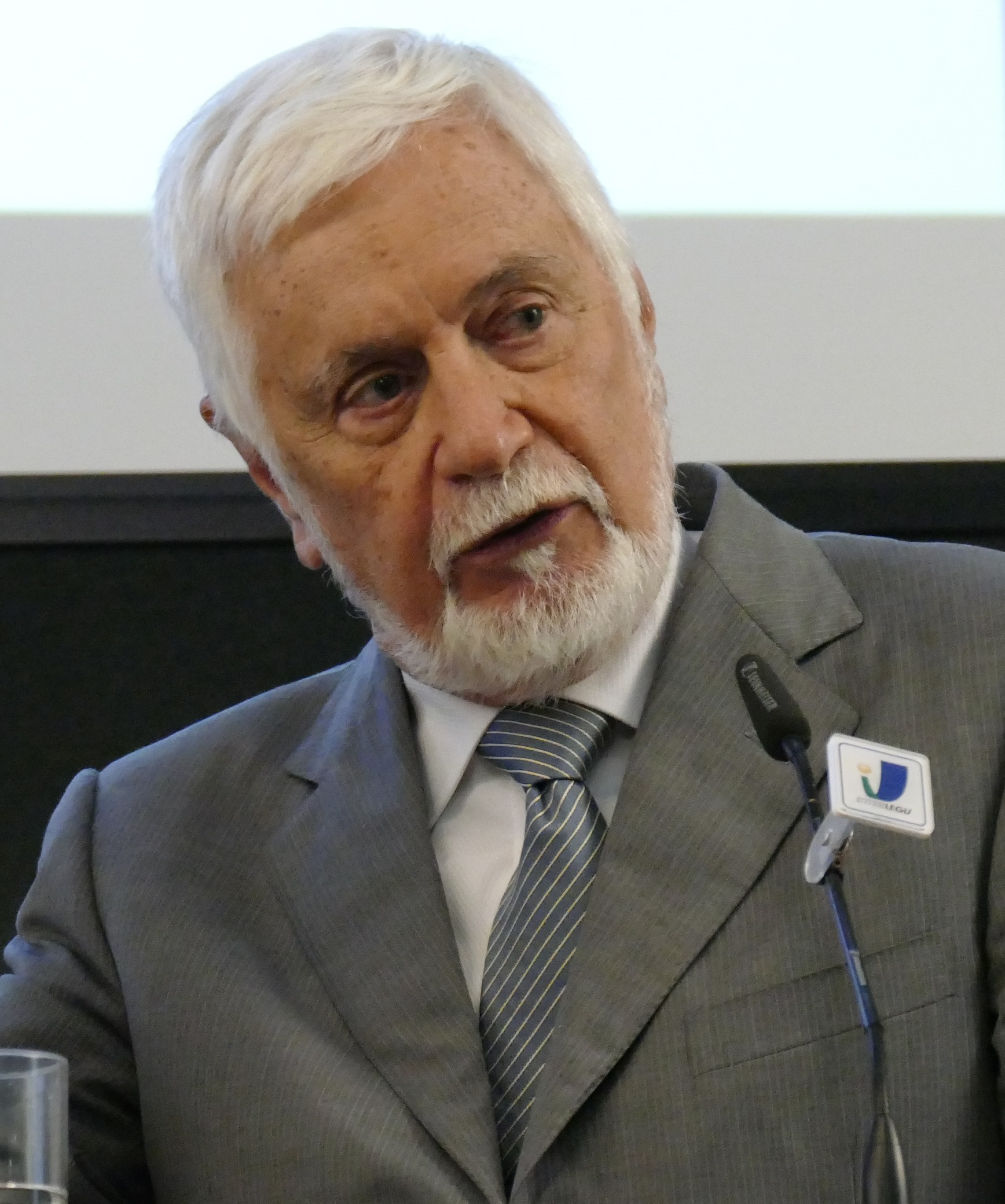
Image of Edmar Bacha

Edmar Lisboa Bacha ( February 14, 1942) is a Brazilian economist.

== Biography ==
He was born in Lambari, Minas Gerais, on February 14, 1942.

He studied at the João Braulio Junior School Group in Lambari and the Colégio Santo Antônio in Belo Horizonte. Afterwards, he studied economics at the Federal University of Minas Gerais in Belo Horizonte and at the Center for the Improvement of Economists, Fundação Getúlio Vargas, Rio de Janeiro. He then moved to the United States, where he pursued graduate studies at Yale University. He obtained his PhD from Yale in 1968, the title of his doctoral dissertation being "An econometric model for the world coffee economy: the impact of Brazilian price policy".

Bacha is the sixth occupant of Chair 40 at the Brazilian Academy of Letters, to which he was elected on November 3, 2016, succeeding Evaristo de Moraes Filho. He was received on April 7, 2017, by academician Fernando Henrique Cardoso.

He is married to Maria Laura Viveiros de Castro Cavalcanti, and he has two children (Julia and Carlos Eduardo) and two stepdaughters (Joana and Maria Clara).
