= Praça Sete de Setembro =

Public square in Belo Horizonte

- Public square
- Praça Sete
- Nickname: Pirulito (obelisk)
- Former name: Praça Doze de Outubro
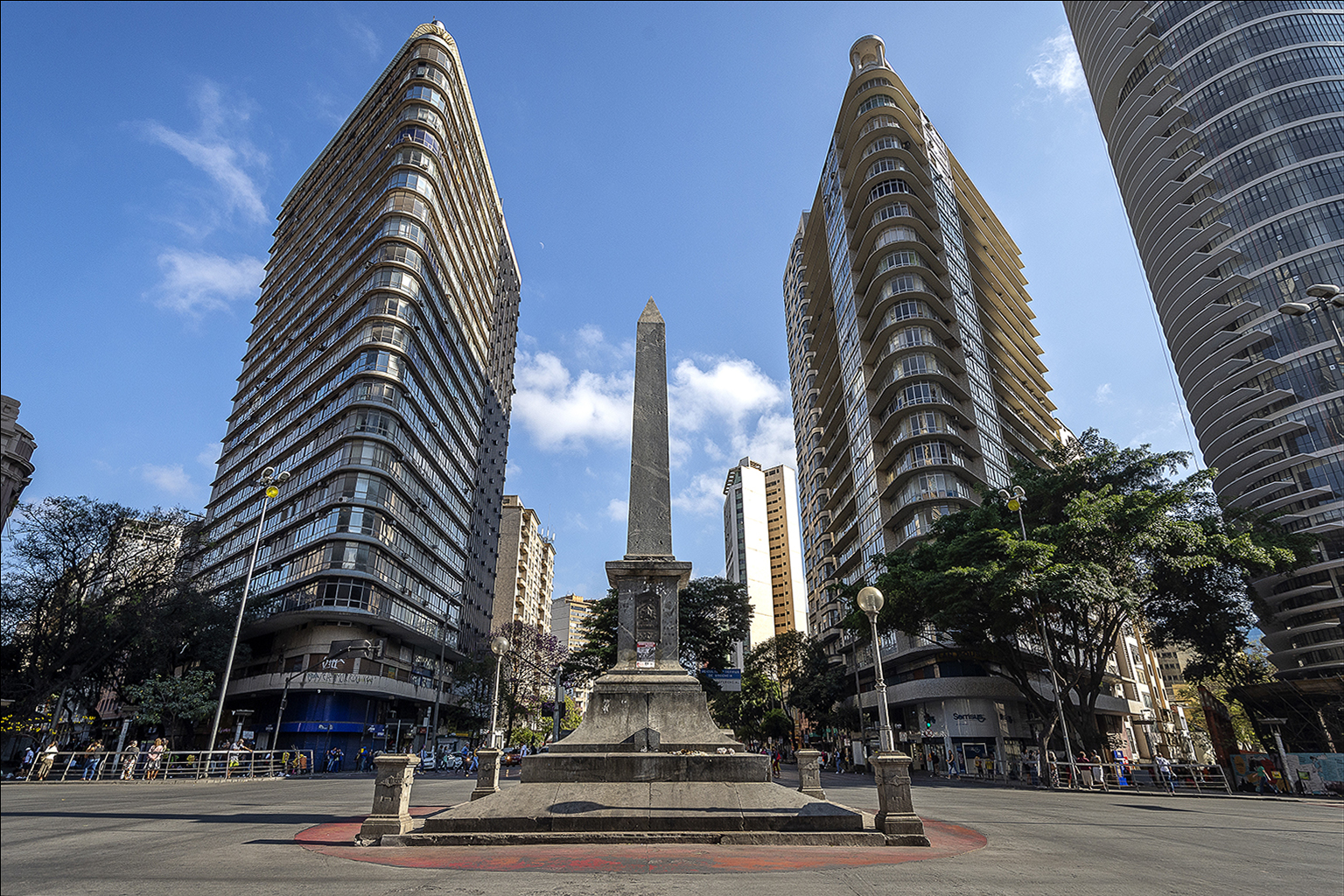
- The Independence Centennial obelisk, known as the Pirulito, at Praça Sete de Setembro
- Features: Monumento Comemorativo do Centenário da Independência Nacional, popularly known as the Pirulito
- Design: Aarão Reis (original city plan and square layout); Antônio Rego (obelisk)
- Builder: Antônio Gonçalves Gravatá (obelisk)
- Constructed: Late 19th century
- Opened: Renamed Praça Sete de Setembro in 1922
- Height: 13.57 m (44.5 ft) (obelisk)
- Surface: Pedestrianized paved blocks
- Architectural style: Planned city square; commemorative obelisk
- Dedicated to: Centennial of the Independence of Brazil
- Location: Centro, Belo Horizonte, Minas Gerais, Brazil
- Address: Intersection of Avenida Afonso Pena and Avenida Amazonas; Crossed by Rua Rio de Janeiro and Rua dos Carijós
- Interactive map of Praça Sete de Setembro
- Coordinates: 19°55′08.84″S 43°56′19.18″W

Praça Sete de Setembro, popularly known as Praça Sete, is a public square in the Centro of Belo Horizonte, Minas Gerais, Brazil. It is located at the intersection of Afonso Pena Avenue and Amazonas Avenue, two of the city’s principal thoroughfares, and is crossed by Rio de Janeiro Street and Carijós Street. The square is regarded as the central point of Belo Horizonte’s central business district and also serves as a venue for cultural events and a landmark within the city center.

The square occupies a central point in Belo Horizonte’s original urban plan, prepared by Aarão Reis in the late 19th century. Before receiving its present name, the site was associated with the names Praça Doze de Outubro and Praça 14 de Outubro. The name Praça Sete de Setembro was adopted in 1922 during celebrations marking the centenary of the Independence of Brazil.

At the centre of the square stands an obelisk, officially known as the Monument Commemorating the Centenary of National Independence and popularly called the ‘‘Pirulito’’. The granite obelisk was designed by architect Antônio Rego following a competition for a monument commemorating the centenary of independence and was inaugurated on 7 September 1924. It was donated to Belo Horizonte by residents of Capela Nova do Betim, now the municipality of Betim.

The monument was removed from the square in the early 1960s, stored at the Abílio Barreto Historical Museum and reinstalled in Diogo de Vasconcelos Square, better known as Savassi Square, in 1963. It returned to Praça Sete in 1980.

== History ==
=== Planned city and early names ===
Praça Sete de Setembro occupies one of the central points of Belo Horizonte’s original urban plan, prepared by Aarão Reis in the late 19th century. The square is located at the intersection of Afonso Pena Avenue and Amazonas Avenue, two of the principal axes of the planned state capital. The intersection marked the centre of the new capital in the original urban plan.

Before the adoption of its present name, the site was associated with more than one designation. The official Belo Horizonte tourism portal states that the square was once called Praça Doze de Outubro, a name connected with the traditional date of Christopher Columbus’s arrival in the Americas. Other sources on the city’s history record the name Praça 14 de Outubro, associated with the creation of the commission responsible for studying possible locations for the new capital of Minas Gerais.

In 1922, during celebrations marking the centenary of the Independence of Brazil, the square was renamed Praça Sete de Setembro. The name refers to 7 September 1822, the date of Brazil's independence from Portugal.

=== Independence Centenary Obelisk ===
The square’s best-known landmark is the Monument Commemorating the Centenary of National Independence, popularly called the ‘‘Pirulito’’. The monument was created to commemorate the centenary of Brazilian independence. Its design, by architect Antônio Rego, was selected through a competition. Although the cornerstone was laid in 1922, the obelisk was not inaugurated until 7 September 1924.

The granite monument was constructed from stone quarried in Capela Nova de Betim, now the municipality of Betim, and was donated to Belo Horizonte by that community. Antônio Gonçalves Gravatá was the engineer responsible for its construction. The monument is 13.57 m (44.5 ft) high and consists of 28 pieces of cut stone. Its pedestal, or plinth, bears four bronze plaques by Francisco de Paula Rocha.

Iron posts mounted on pedestals originally stood at the corners of the base and were modeled by Austrian sculptor João Amadeu Mucchiut. These elements later disappeared and were replaced in 2003.

=== Relocation and return of the ‘‘Pirulito’’ ===
The obelisk did not remain continuously in Praça Sete. In 1962, it was placed in storage at the Abílio Barreto Historical Museum. The following year, during the administration of mayor Amintas de Barros, it was reinstalled in Diogo de Vasconcelos Square, better known as Savassi Square. It returned to Praça Sete in 1980 following modernization works at the square.

The monument received state heritage protection in 1977. The governing council of IEPHA-MG approved its designation in March of that year, and State Decree No. 18,531 of 2 June 1977 entered it in the register of historic heritage.

=== Surrounding buildings ===
Praça Sete is surrounded by buildings representing different periods in the architectural and commercial history of central Belo Horizonte. The Cine Theatro Brasil, built in 1932 at the corner of Amazonas Avenue and Carijós Street, became one of the best-known landmarks surrounding the square.

Other nearby buildings include the former Banco da Lavoura building, also known as the Clemente Faria Building, designed by Álvaro Vital Brazil in 1946. The Modernist building was constructed between 1946 and 1950 at the corner of Afonso Pena Avenue and Rio de Janeiro Street and received an award at the first São Paulo Architecture Biennial.

The former Banco Mineiro da Produção building, now known as P7, was designed by Oscar Niemeyer in 1953 and inaugurated in 1959 on a triangular lot facing the square. It later received state heritage protection. With 26 storeys, a Modernist design and a prominent position on Praça Sete, it became one of the landmarks of Belo Horizonte’s mid-20th-century vertical development.

The building housing the UAI Praça Sete public-service center, formerly a PSIU unit, also forms part of the historic ensemble surrounding the square. Constructed in the late 19th century, it previously housed the headquarters of the Banco Hipotecário e Agrícola do Estado de Minas Gerais. The public-service centre operates at 478 Amazonas Avenue.

The nearby Acaiaca Building, an Art Deco skyscraper on Afonso Pena Avenue, also became part of the visual identity of central Belo Horizonte. Designed by Luiz Pinto Coelho in 1943 and inaugurated in 1947, it was the tallest building in Minas Gerais for several decades and, for a short period, the tallest building in Brazil.

=== Pedestrian blocks, later renovations and present use ===
The present configuration of Praça Sete developed from the closure of four blocks surrounding the central intersection. In the early 1970s, the square was reconfigured through the creation of these pedestrianized blocks, increasing the area available for pedestrians to circulate and remain in the square.

After the obelisk returned from Savassi, the area was reorganized into pedestrian blocks named after Indigenous peoples associated with Minas Gerais. The closed section of Carijós Street between Praça Sete and Espírito Santo Street was named Pataxó. The section of Carijós Street between Praça Sete and São Paulo Street became Krenak. The section of Rio de Janeiro Street between Praça Sete and Tamoios Street was named Xacriabá, while the section of Rio de Janeiro Street between Praça Sete and Tupinambás Street became Maxakali.

A revitalization project completed in 2003 renovated the square and its four pedestrian blocks, giving each closed section a new design and improving the area for public use. Following the renovation, the square and obelisk became part of the operational collection of the Abílio Barreto Historical Museum.

In 2023, the pedestrian blocks of Praça Sete underwent further work as part of the Belo Horizonte municipal government’s ‘‘Centro de Todo Mundo’’ program. The project included improvements to pavements and flooring, restoration of benches and street furniture, and measures intended to improve accessibility and mobility.

The area also serves as a public-service hub. At 478 Amazonas Avenue, the Minas Gerais government operates UAI Praça Sete, where residents can access a range of government services in one location.

== Sporting celebrations, demonstrations and public events ==
Praça Sete hosts gatherings of sports supporters, political demonstrations, social mobilizations and civic events. Its location in the central business district, explains this use. The obelisk known as the ‘‘Pirulito’’ also facilitates large gatherings by serving as a conspicuous meeting point in the middle of the square.

As a site of protest, Fabiano Rosa de Magalhães wrote that this use was not inherent in the square from the time of its creation. Rather, it developed in the streets through demonstrations, public gatherings and disputes over the right to occupy the space in the city center. Another study, by the Federal University of Minas Gerais, examined demonstrations in Praça Sete, Praça da Estação and Praça da Liberdade. The study compared Praça Sete with Praça da Estação as sites of protest, urban conflict and popular occupation in Belo Horizonte.Between 1 April 2006 and 31 December 2019, the Belo Horizonte Observatory of Urban Conflicts recorded 1,321 collective demonstrations in the city.

Football celebrations also attract supporters to the square. In 2013, after Clube Atlético Mineiro won the 2013 Copa Libertadores, supporters gathered in Praça Sete for a celebration attended by several players. In 2014, following Atlético’s victory in the 2014 Copa do Brasil, Praça Sete and Olegário Maciel Avenue were among the gathering points for supporters in Belo Horizonte.

Atlético supporters returned to the square in 2021. After the club won the 2021 Campeonato Brasileiro Série A, Atlético players arrived in Belo Horizonte and travelled in an open-top vehicle to Praça Sete, where thousands of supporters celebrated during the night. The celebration included sound trucks near the obelisk and continued into the early morning. At 6:00 a.m., the municipal cleaning authority began an operation involving 95 street cleaners, three water trucks and seven dump trucks in the vicinity of Praça Sete and the club’s headquarters. A few days later, after Atlético won the 2021 Copa do Brasil, supporters again gathered in Praça Sete to celebrate.

Supporters of Cruzeiro also use Praça Sete for celebrations. In 2013, during the club’s successful national championship campaign, Cruzeiro supporters gathered in Praça Sete and Praça da Estação to celebrate a victory. In 2022, after a victory secured Cruzeiro’s return to the top division of the Brazilian league, hundreds of supporters filled Praça Sete, sang the club anthem and set off fireworks. Traffic was partially blocked, and the Military Police isolated the area around the obelisk to prevent incidents. The following week, the players and coaching staff participated in a celebration in central Belo Horizonte. Attendance was estimated at 40,000, with road closures and infrastructure provided for supporters, members of the press, players, club employees, friends and relatives.

The square also hosts public-service initiatives and social mobilizations. In 2025, an event promoting women’s rights was held there by the Municipal Council for Women’s Rights with support from the Belo Horizonte municipal government. The program included public services, musical performances, discussion circles, support tents and a Brazilian Sign Language interpreter.

== Gallery ==
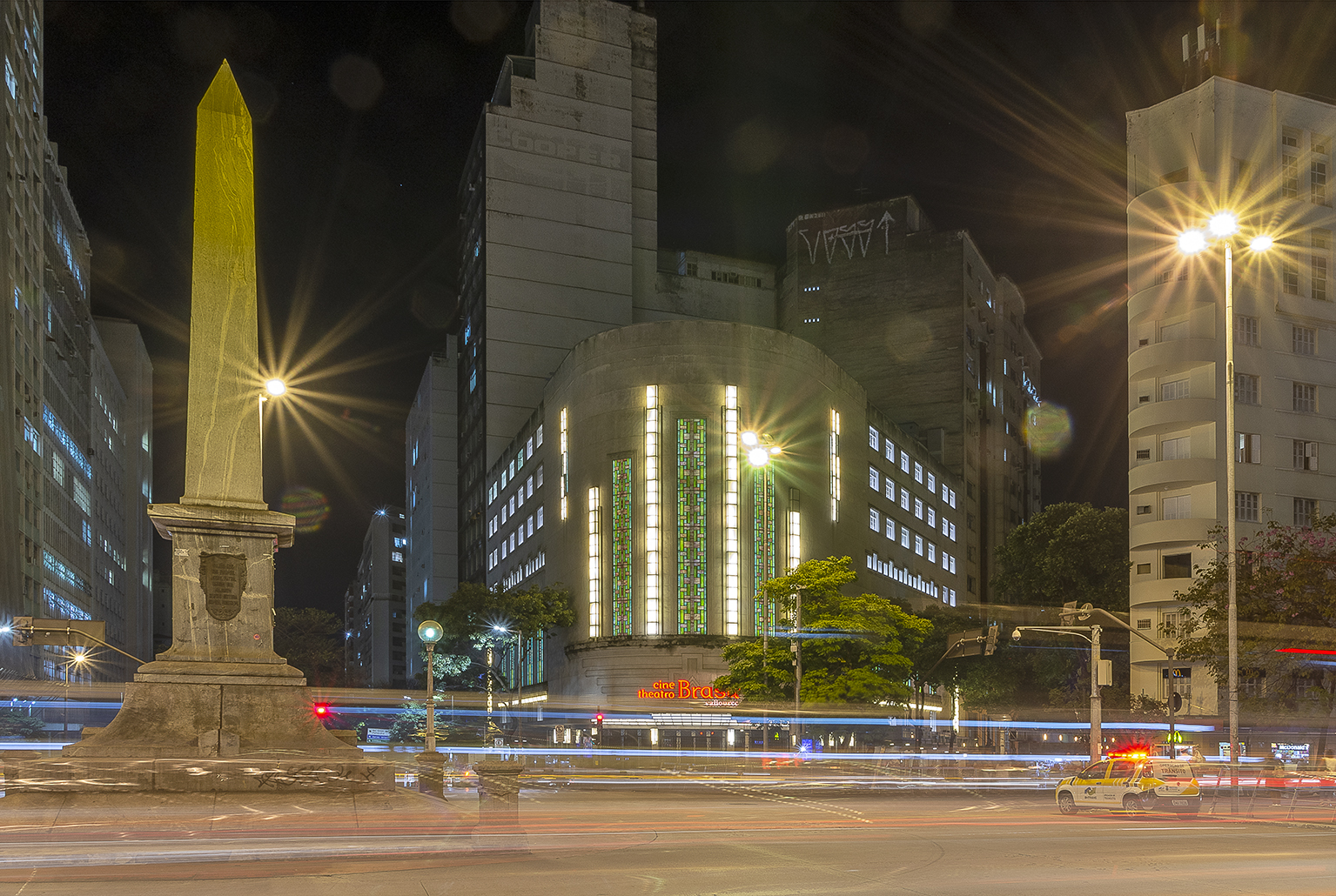
Cine Theatro Brasil, one of the landmarks surrounding Praça Sete

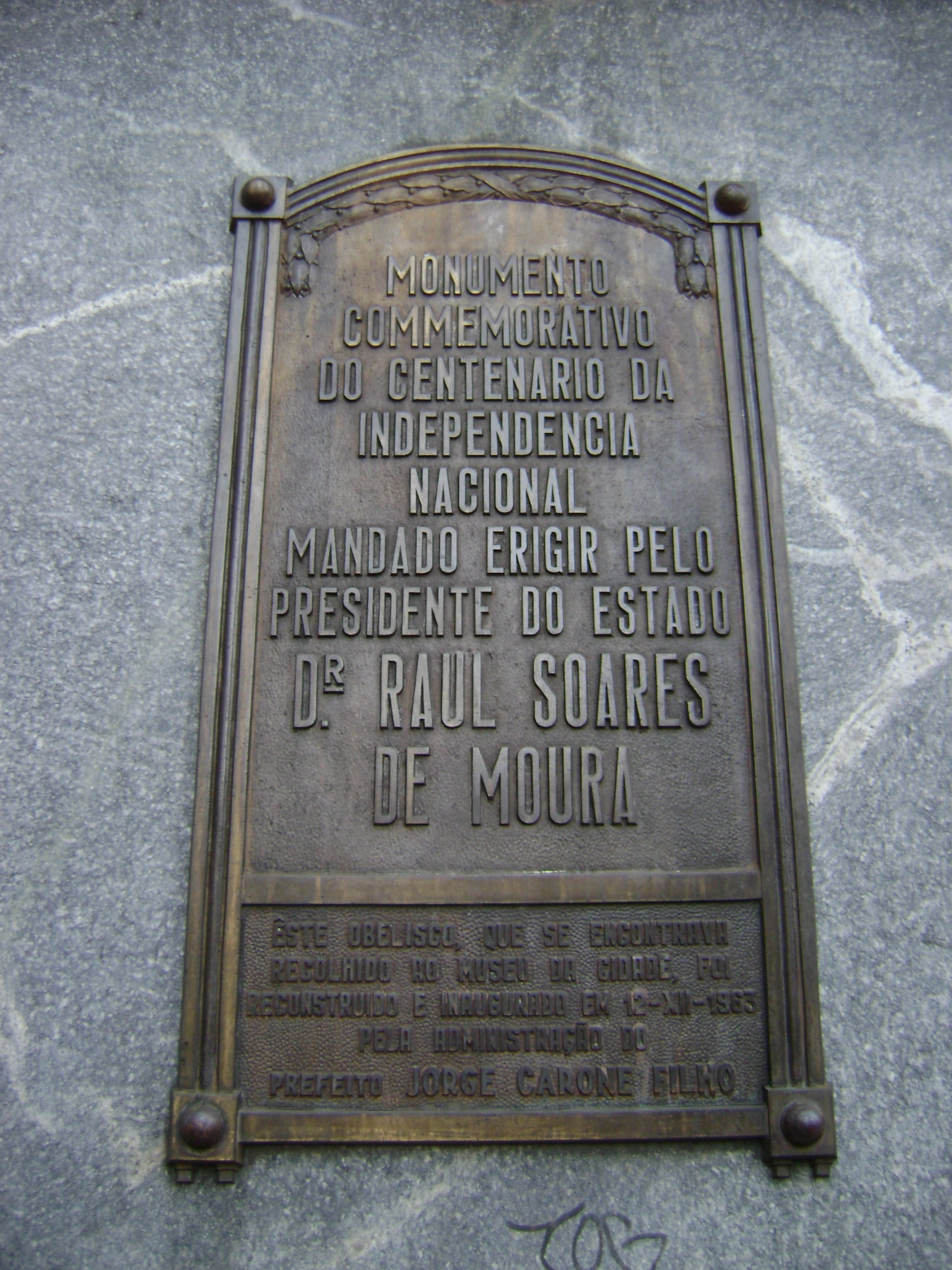
Bronze plaque on the Independence Centenary Obelisk

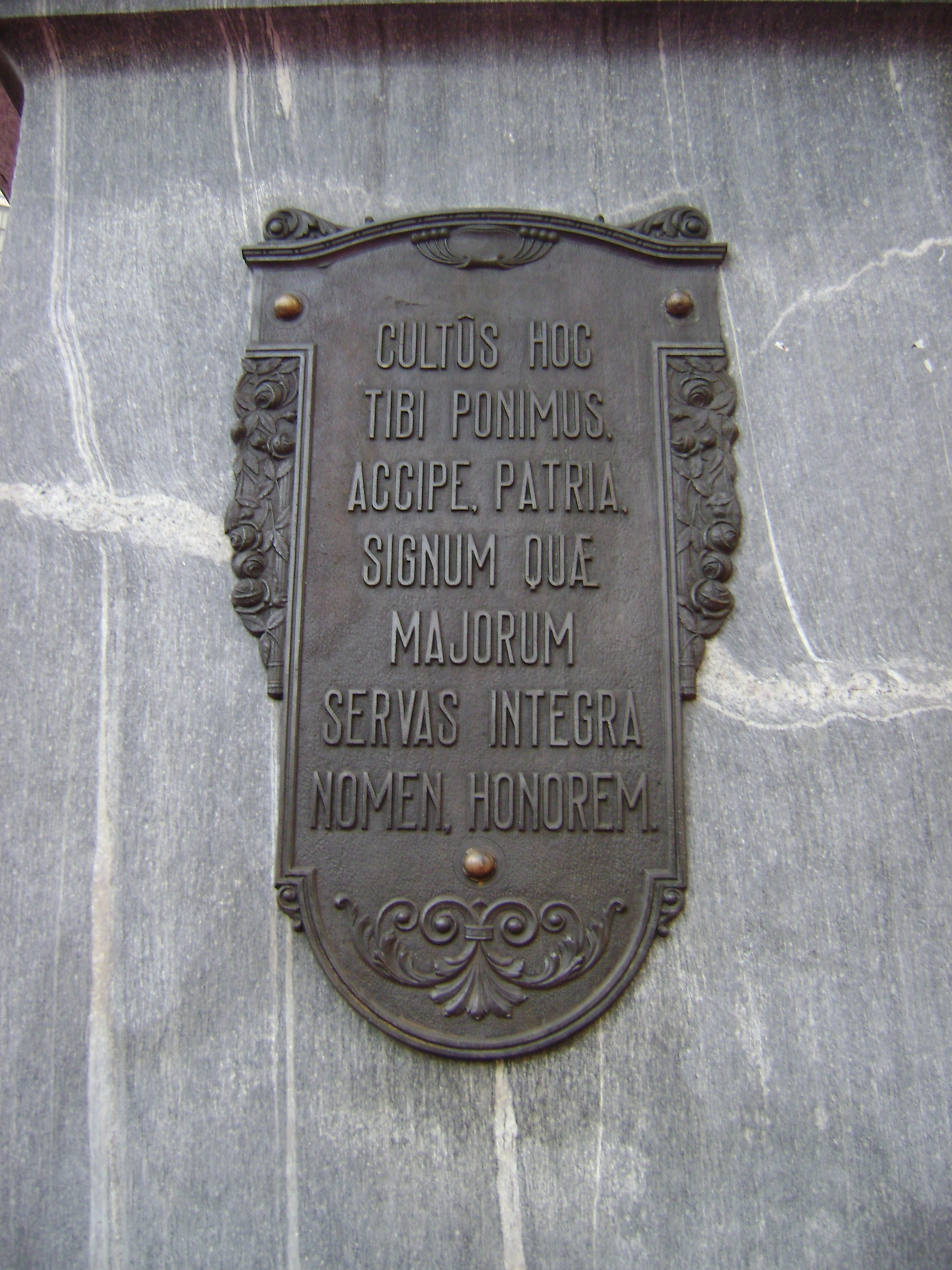
Detail of a bronze plaque on the obelisk

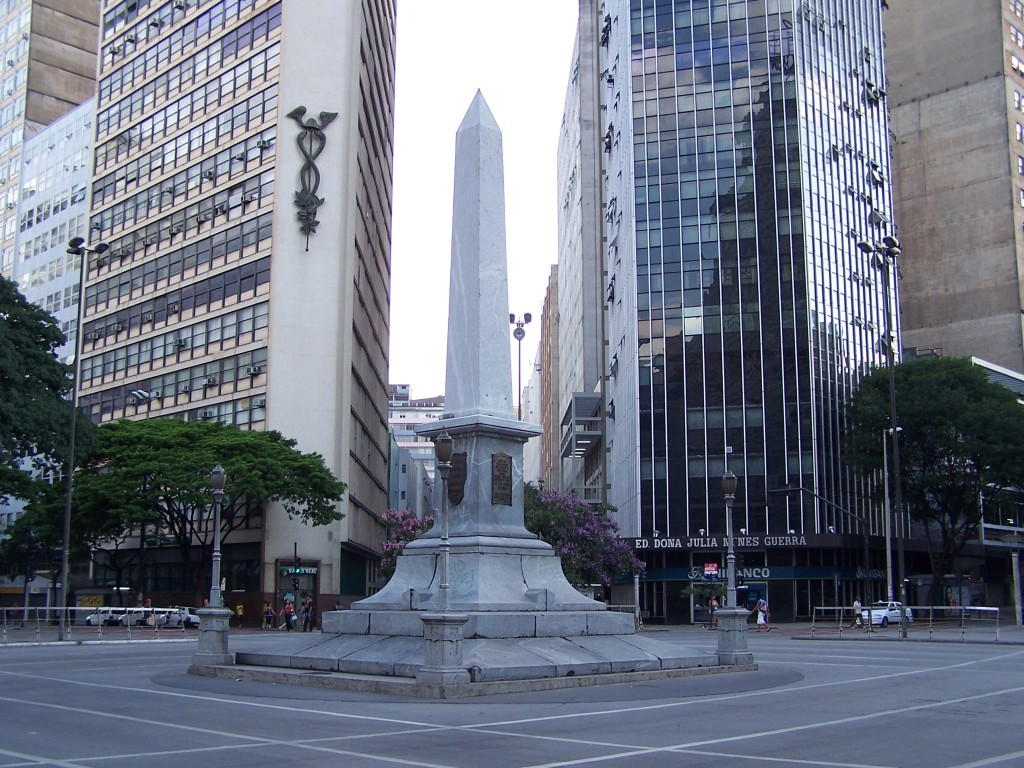
Praça Sete de Setembro in central Belo Horizonte

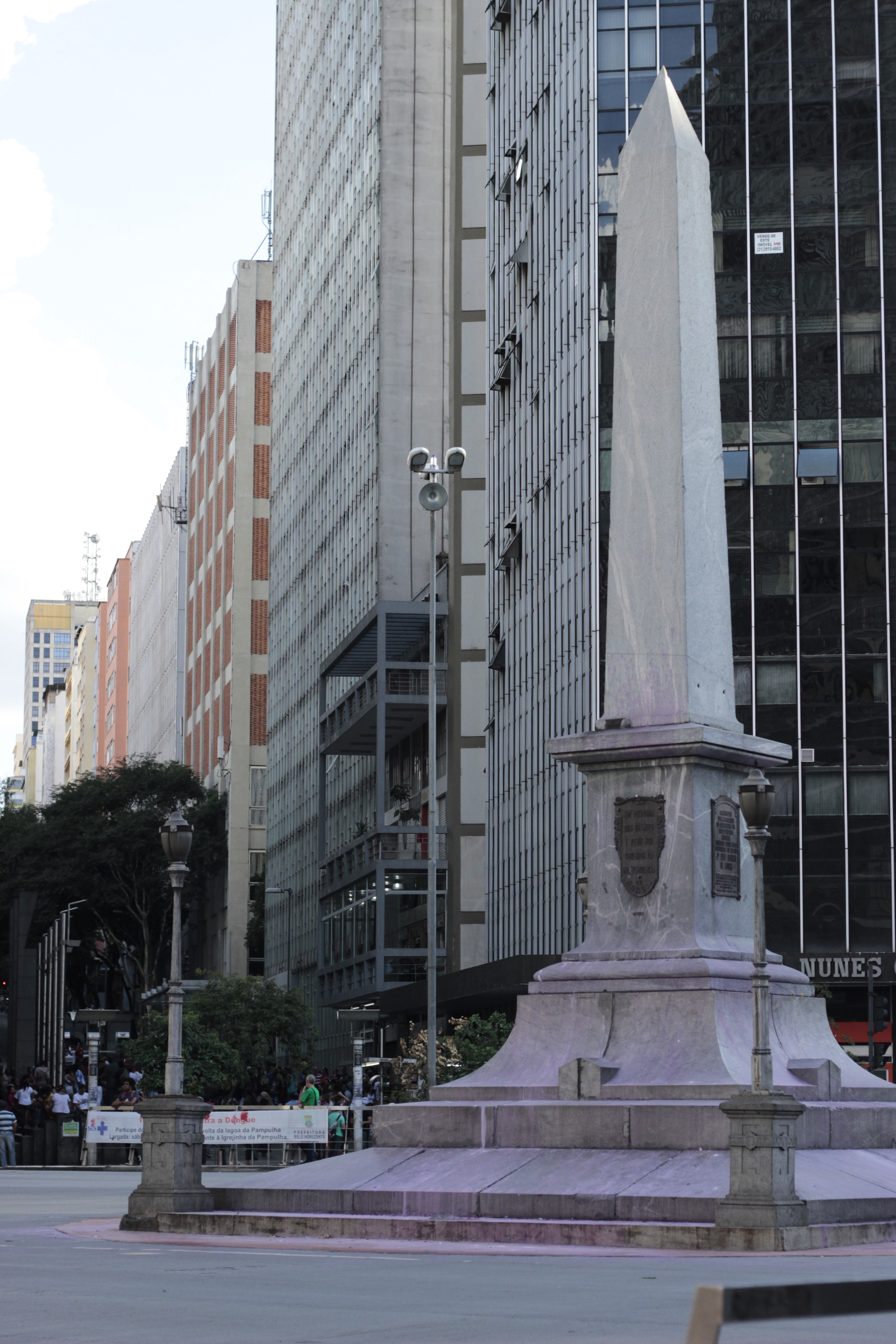
Praça Sete and the high-rise buildings of central Belo Horizonte

== See also ==
Afonso Pena Avenue, a major avenue that crosses the square Praça da Liberdade, a historic square in Belo Horizonte planned to accommodate state government buildings Praça Raul Soares, another nearby public square in central Belo Horizonte Américo Renné Giannetti Municipal Park, a historic public park near Praça Sete and central Belo Horizonte Acaiaca Building, an Art Deco landmark near Praça Sete in central Belo Horizonte List of squares in Belo Horizonte Obelisk of Praça Sete de Setembro
