= Praça Diogo de Vasconcelos =

Praça Diogo Vasconcelos
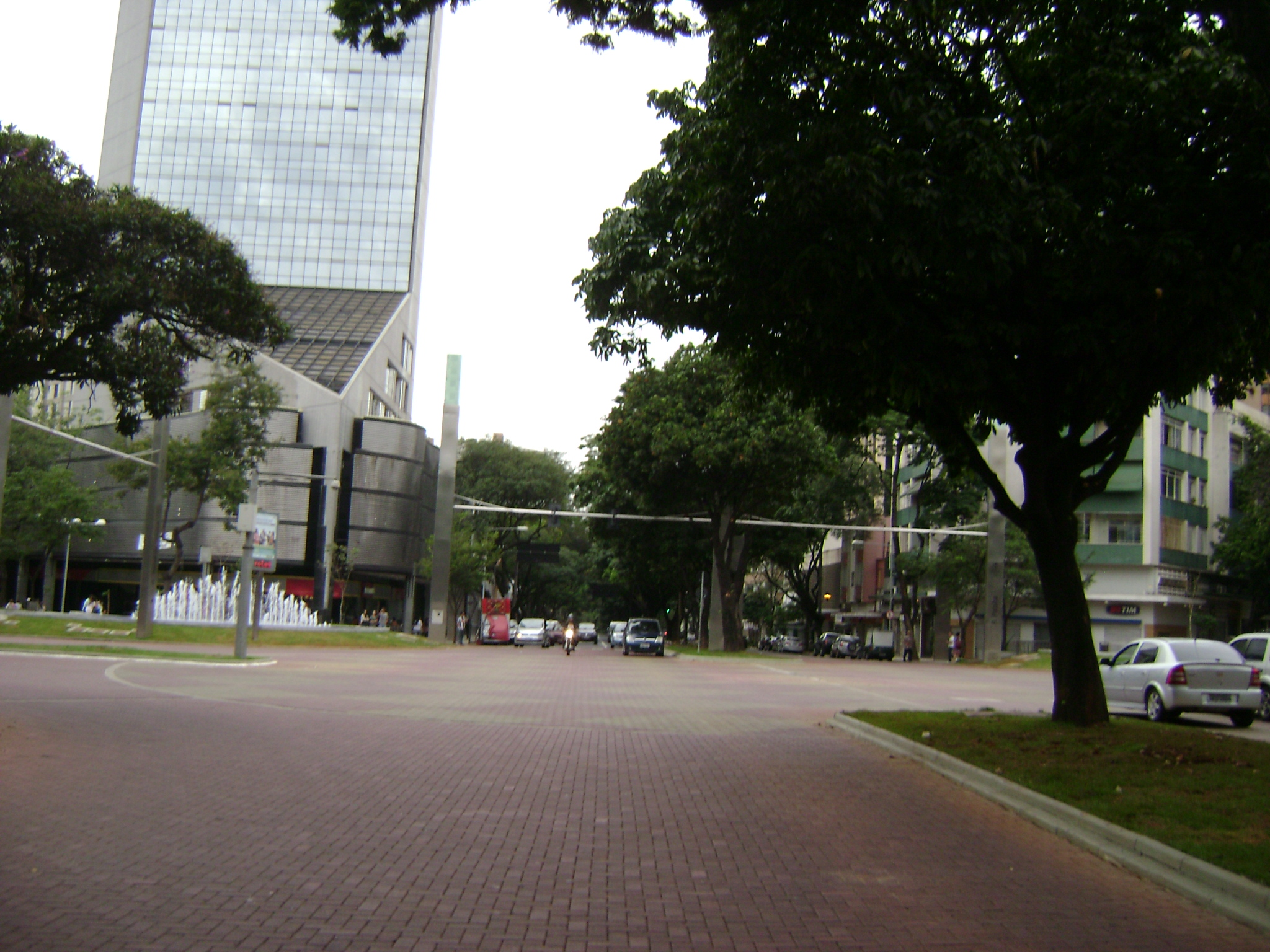
- Nickname: Praça da Savassi
- Location in Belo Horizonte
- Coordinates: 19.938333°S 43.935833°W

The Praça Diogo de Vasconcelos or Praça da Savassi (Diogo de Vasconcelos Square or Savassi Square) is a public square of Savassi, in the city of Belo Horizonte. It is located at the confluence of the avenues Cristóvão Colombo and Getúlio Vargas. Also there flow the streets Pernambuco and Antônio de Albuquerque.

Its official name honors the politician and historian Diogo de Vasconcelos, which stood out as a pioneer in defense of the historical and artistic heritage, mining and national level and is considered the first historian of art in Brazil. The official name is not as popular as the informal Square Savassi, which derives from the Bakery Savassi who had a seat at the corner of Rua Pernambuco with avenida Cristóvão Colombo. The marquee's original bakery could still be seen on the site, behind the plateboutiqueToulon until the installation of a coffee shop Arturo's, when it was removed.

The square a lively meeting place for belo-horizontinos, since it is located in the center of the neighborhood of Savassi, an important commercial city. The wide range of patrons range from families who go shopping or to the cafes and restaurants in the area until the young bohemian who frequents the bars or spend the weekend nights on the banks of the square. Since 2006, the site that once housed mostly boutiques, restaurants and snack bars, shops was invaded by mobile companies. The patrons of the traditional Café Três Corações (Three Hearts Café) came to protest against its closure at the site due to the opening of a store operator Claro. After the protest, the cafe has been reopened in a smaller area, corresponding to a small fraction of the old facility, with access only by Rua Antonio de Albuquerque.

== Gallery of square before reforms ==
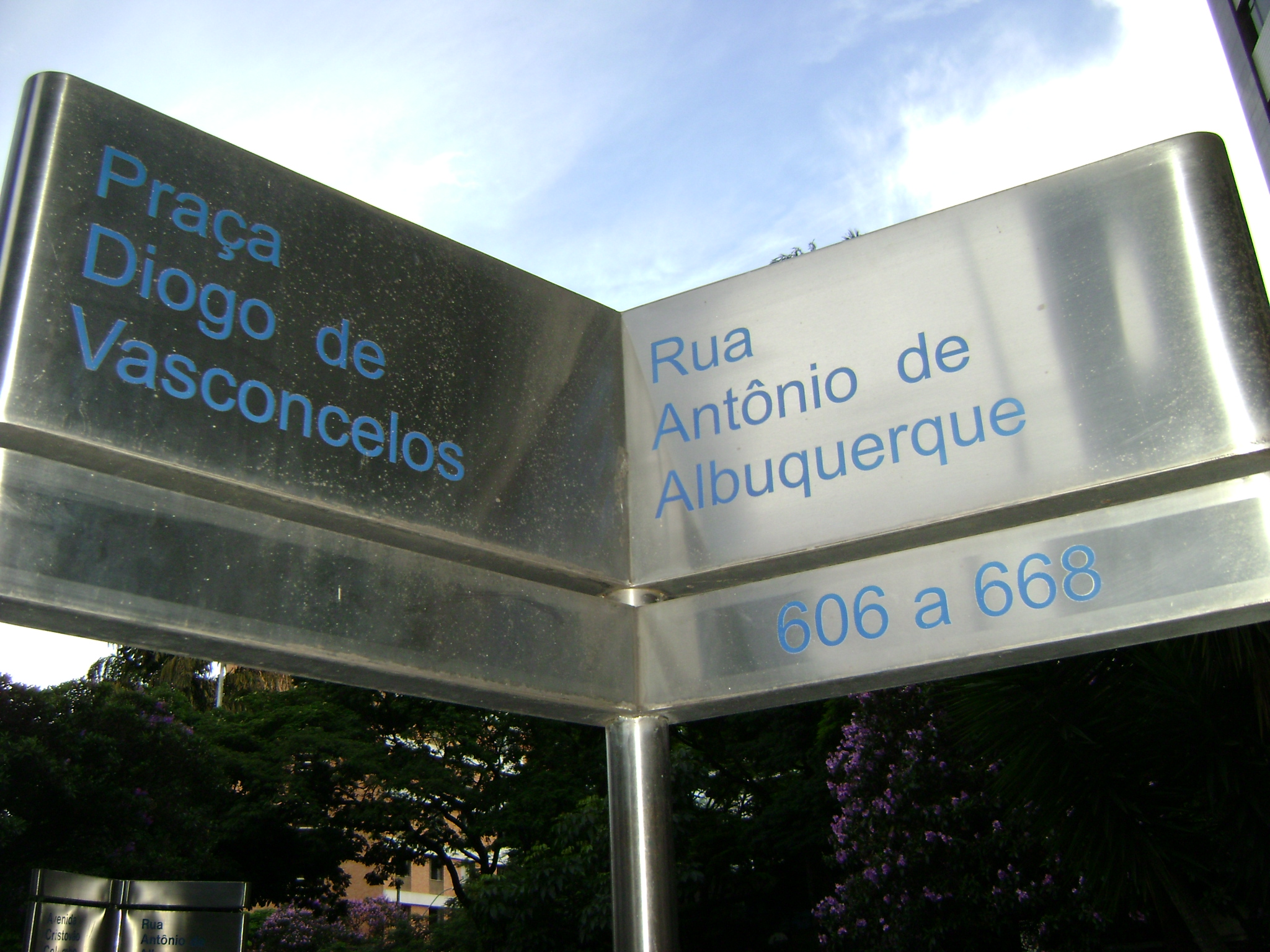
Sign at the square

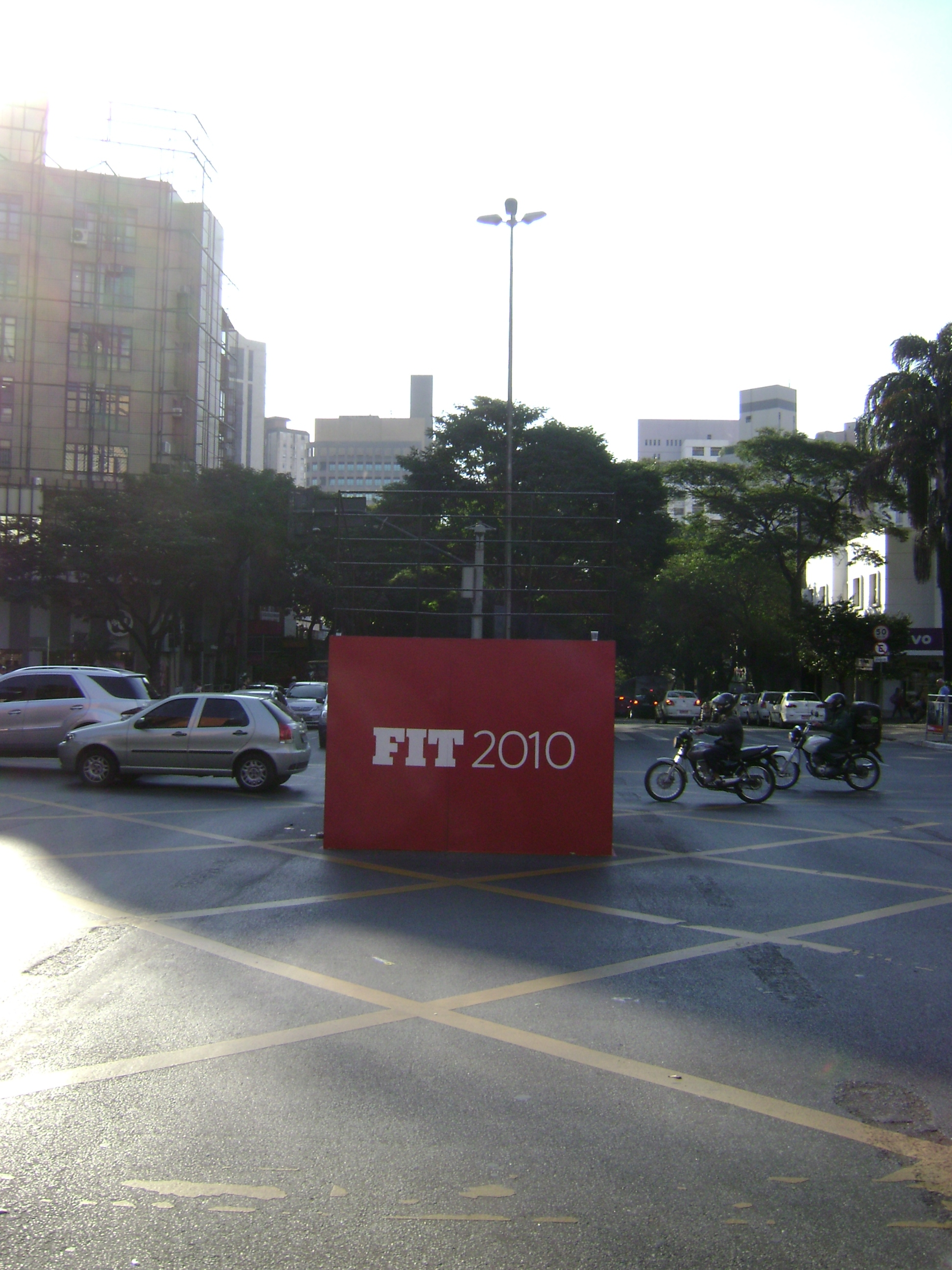

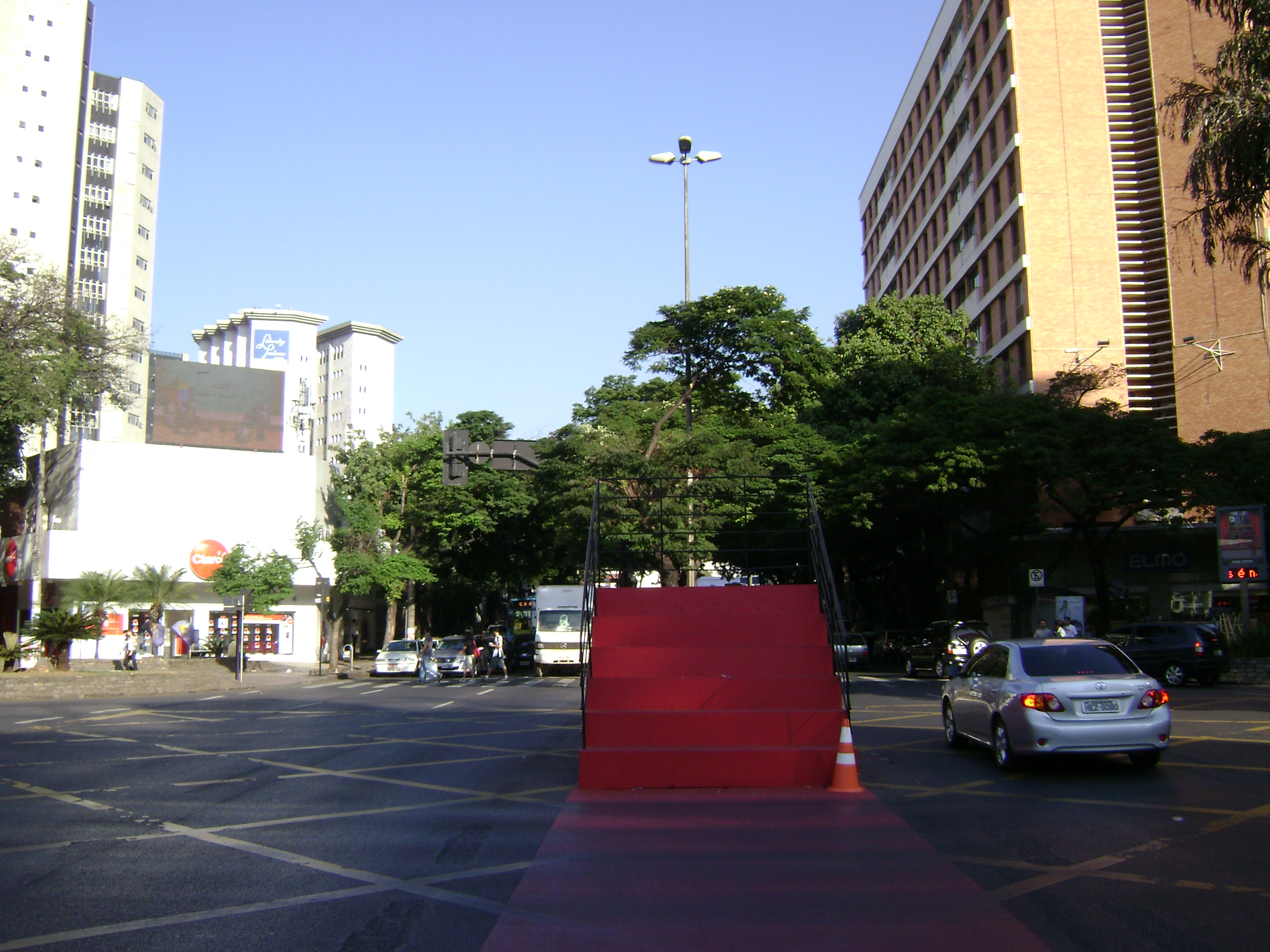

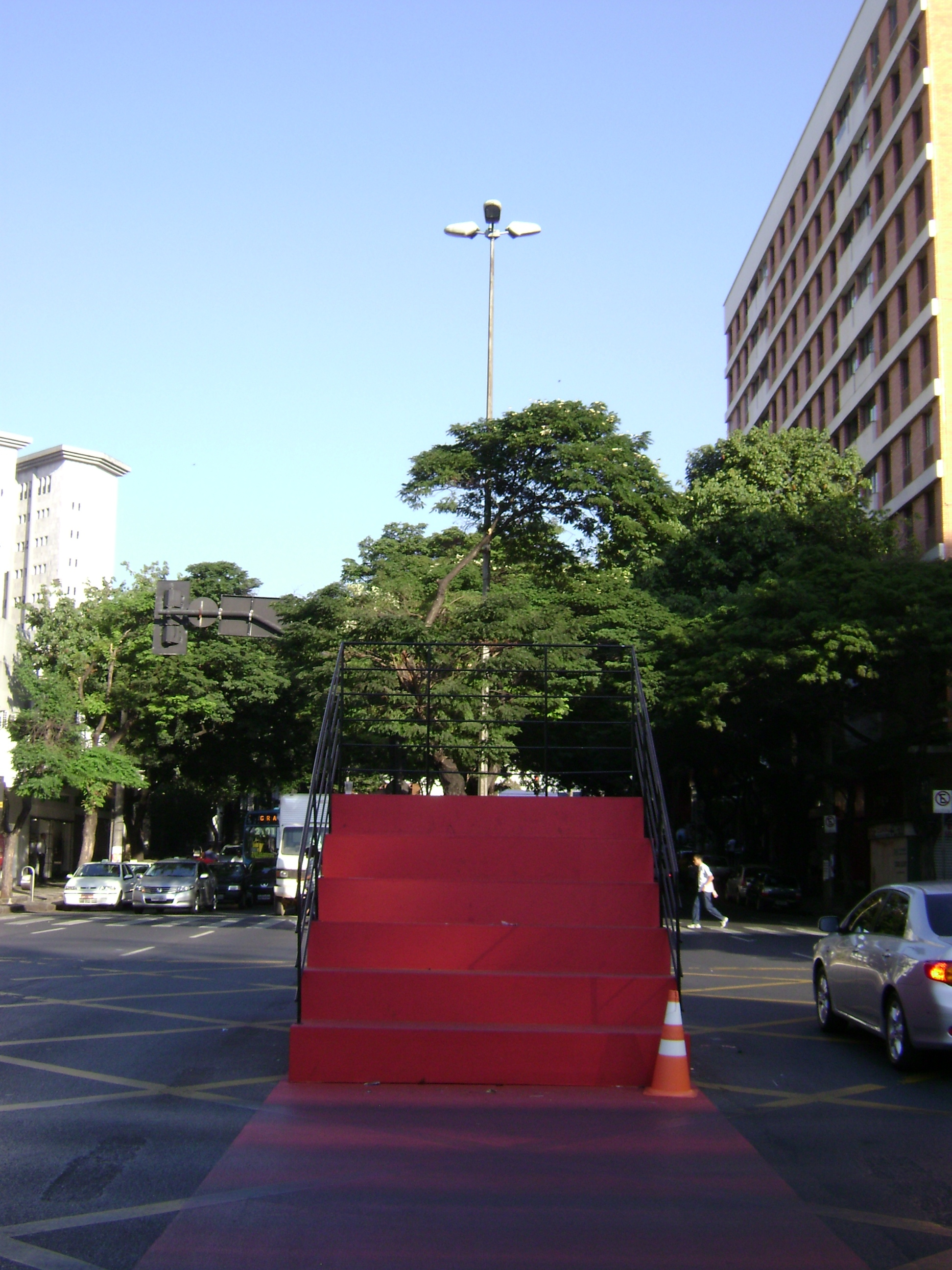

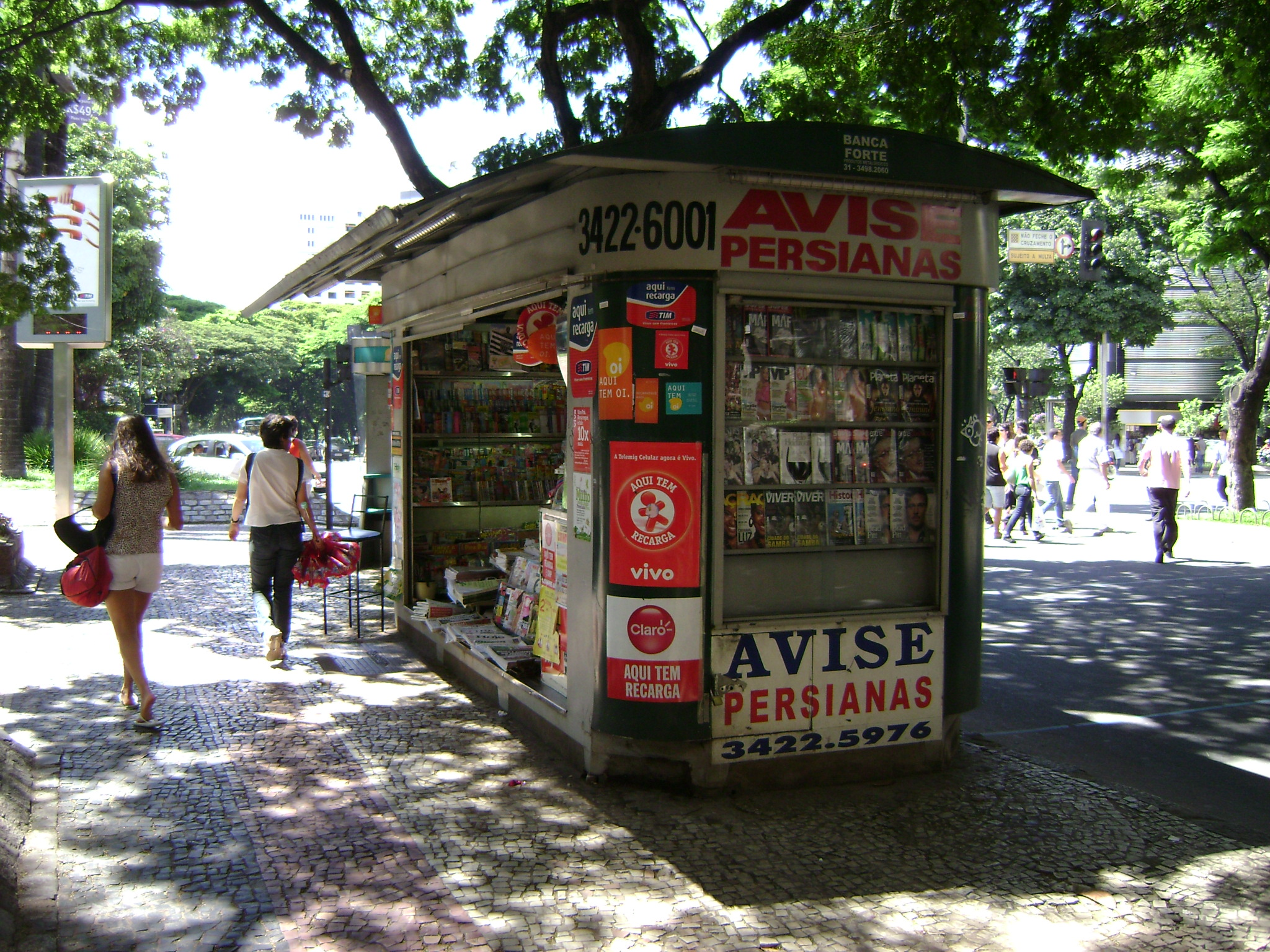

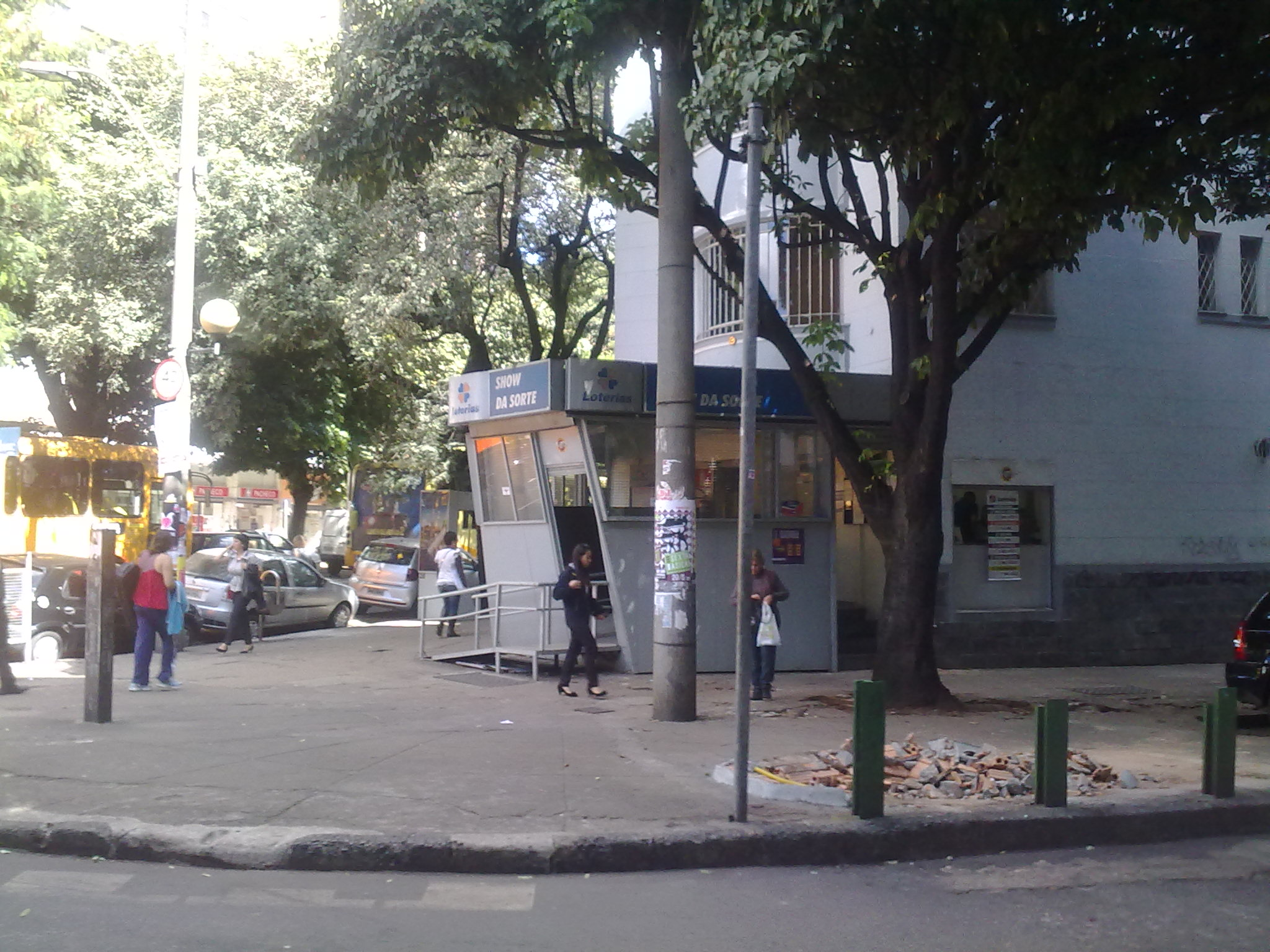

== Gallery of the square in the reforms ==
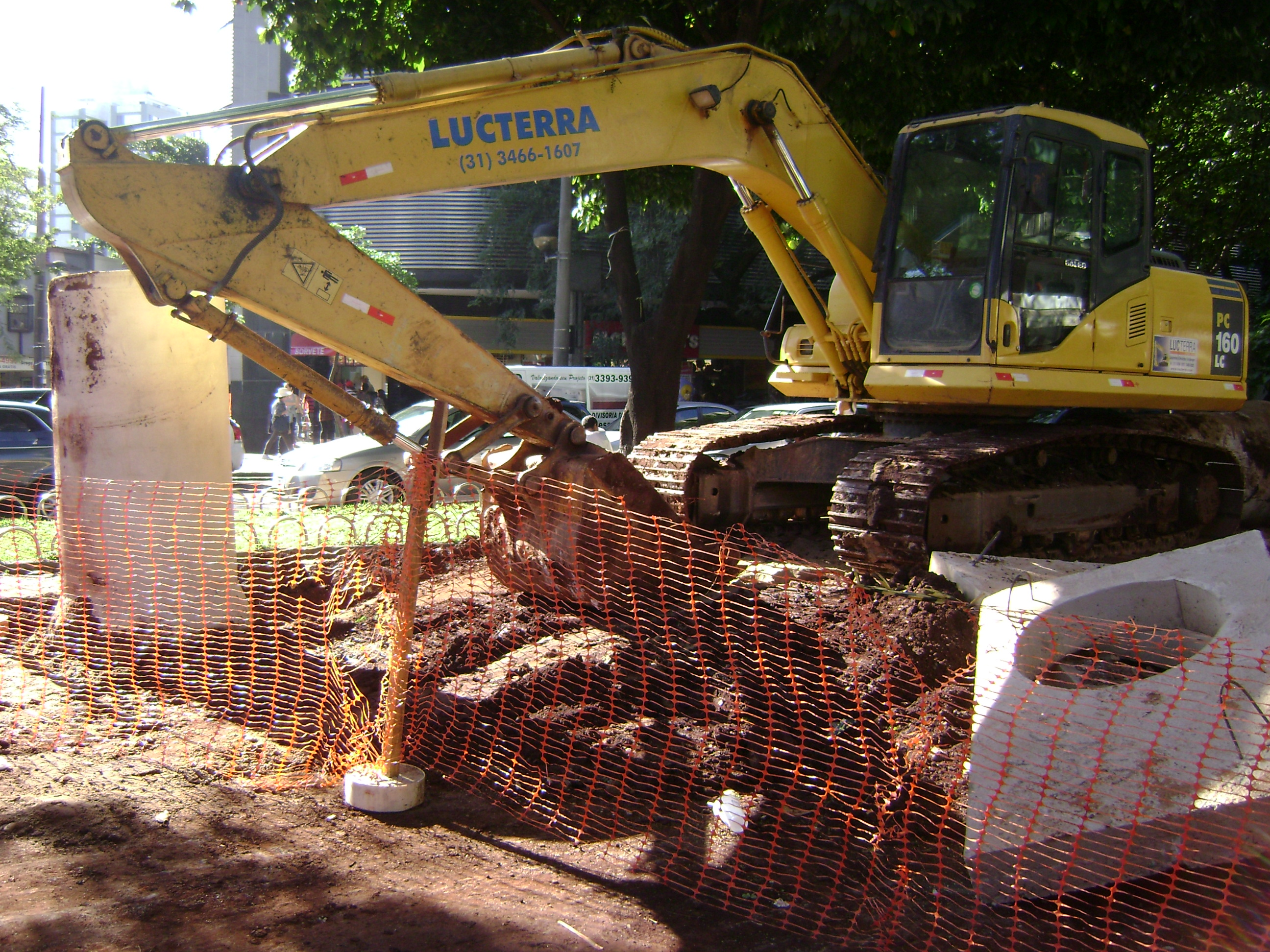

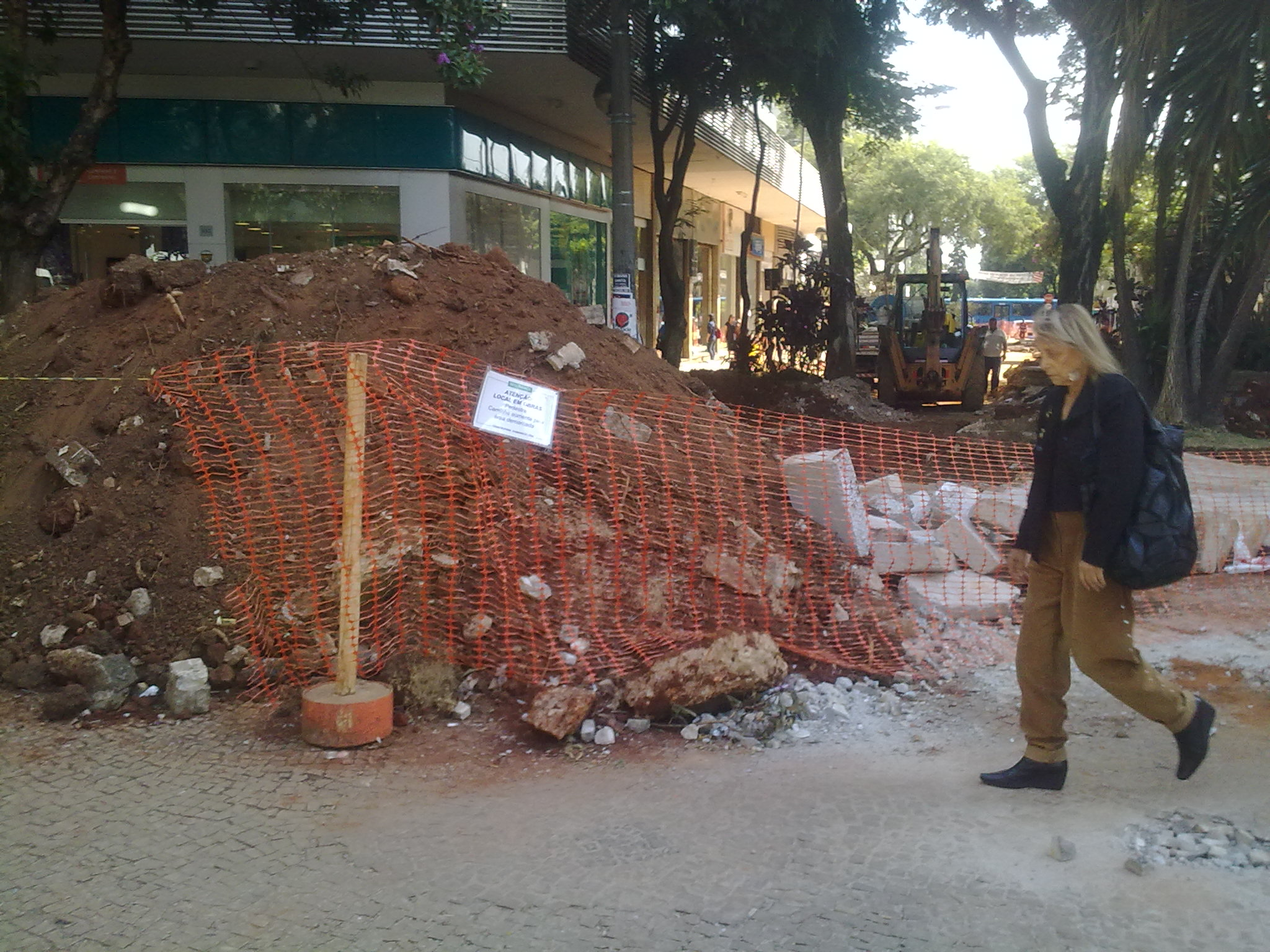

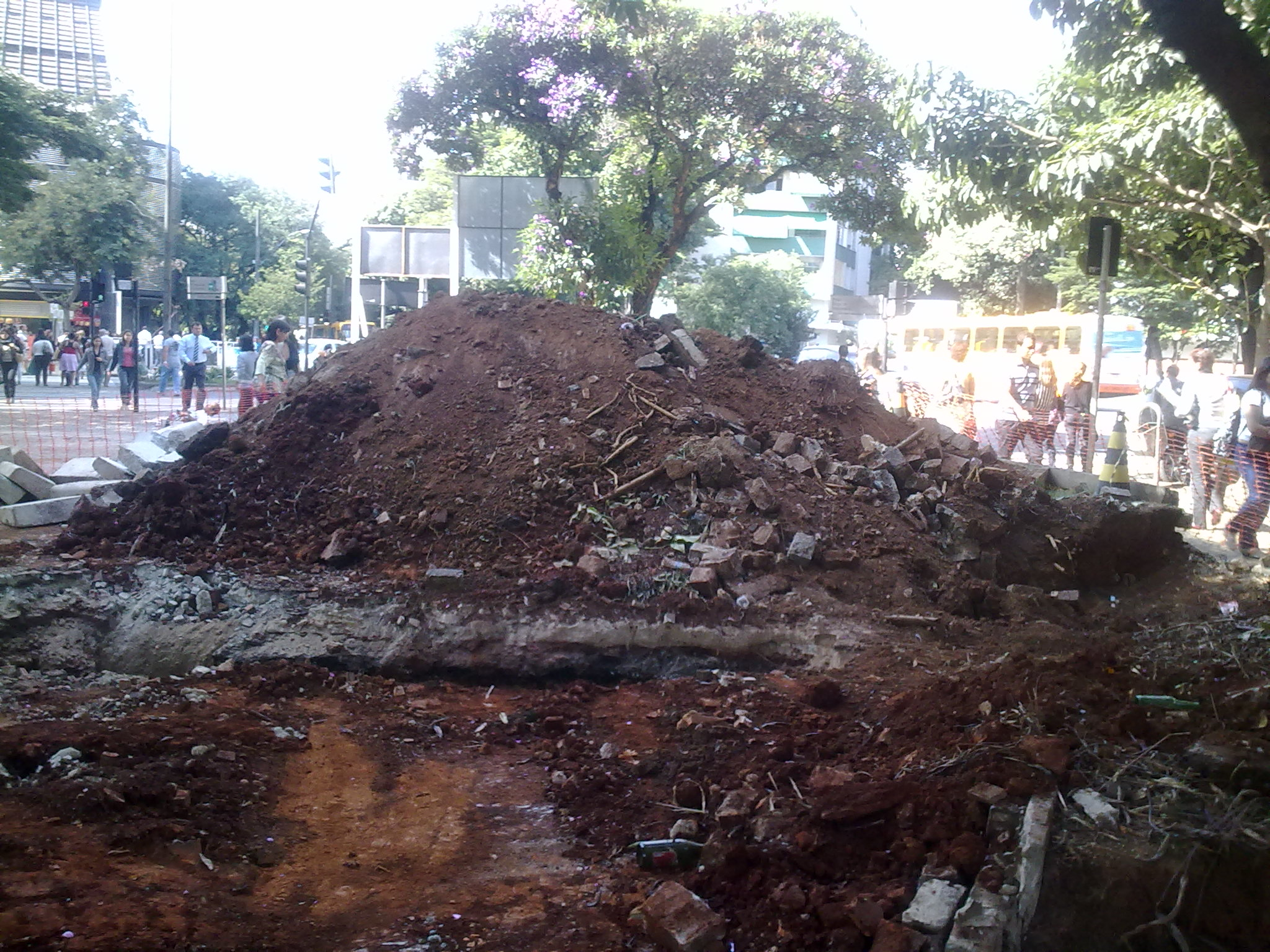

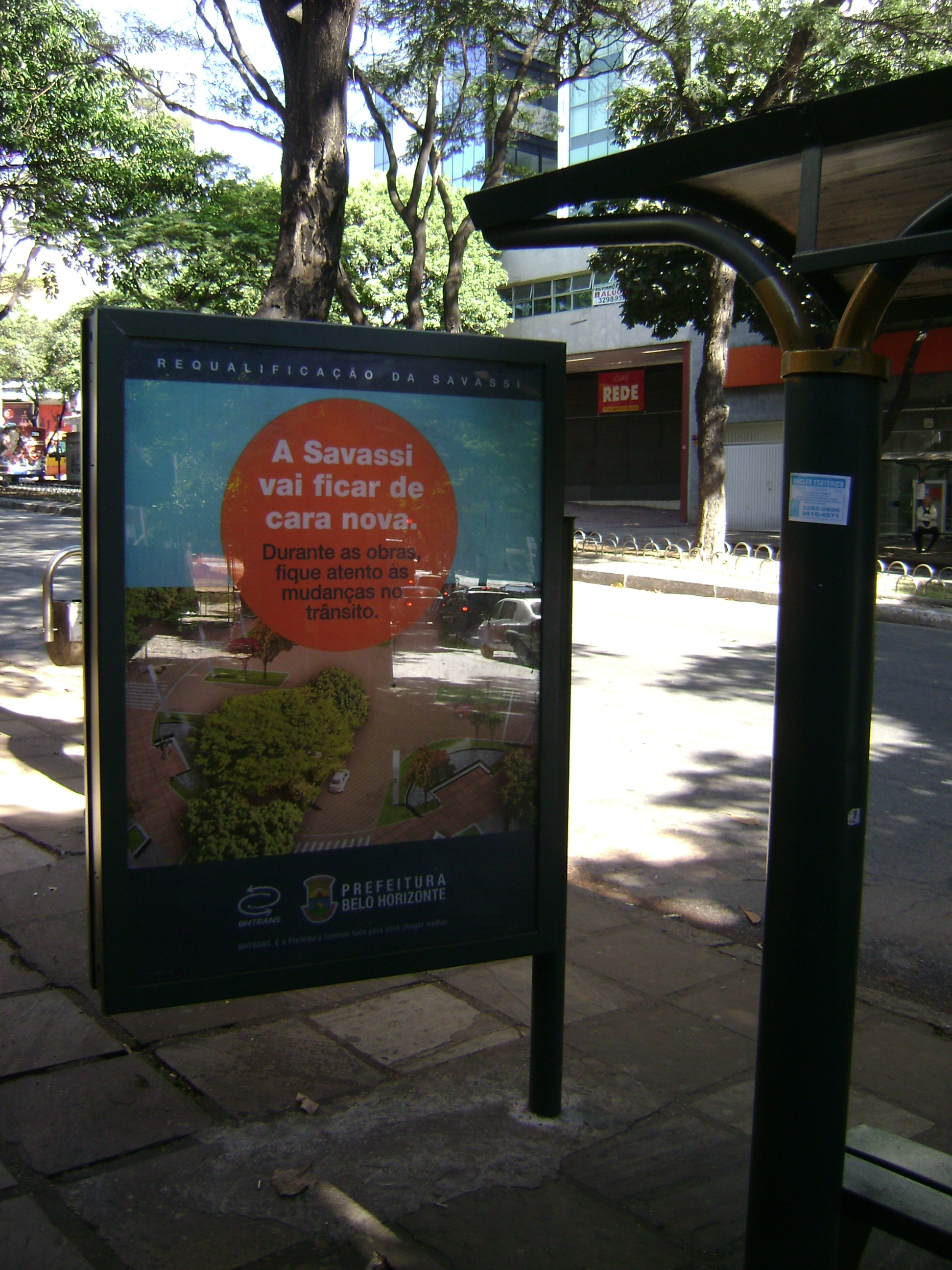

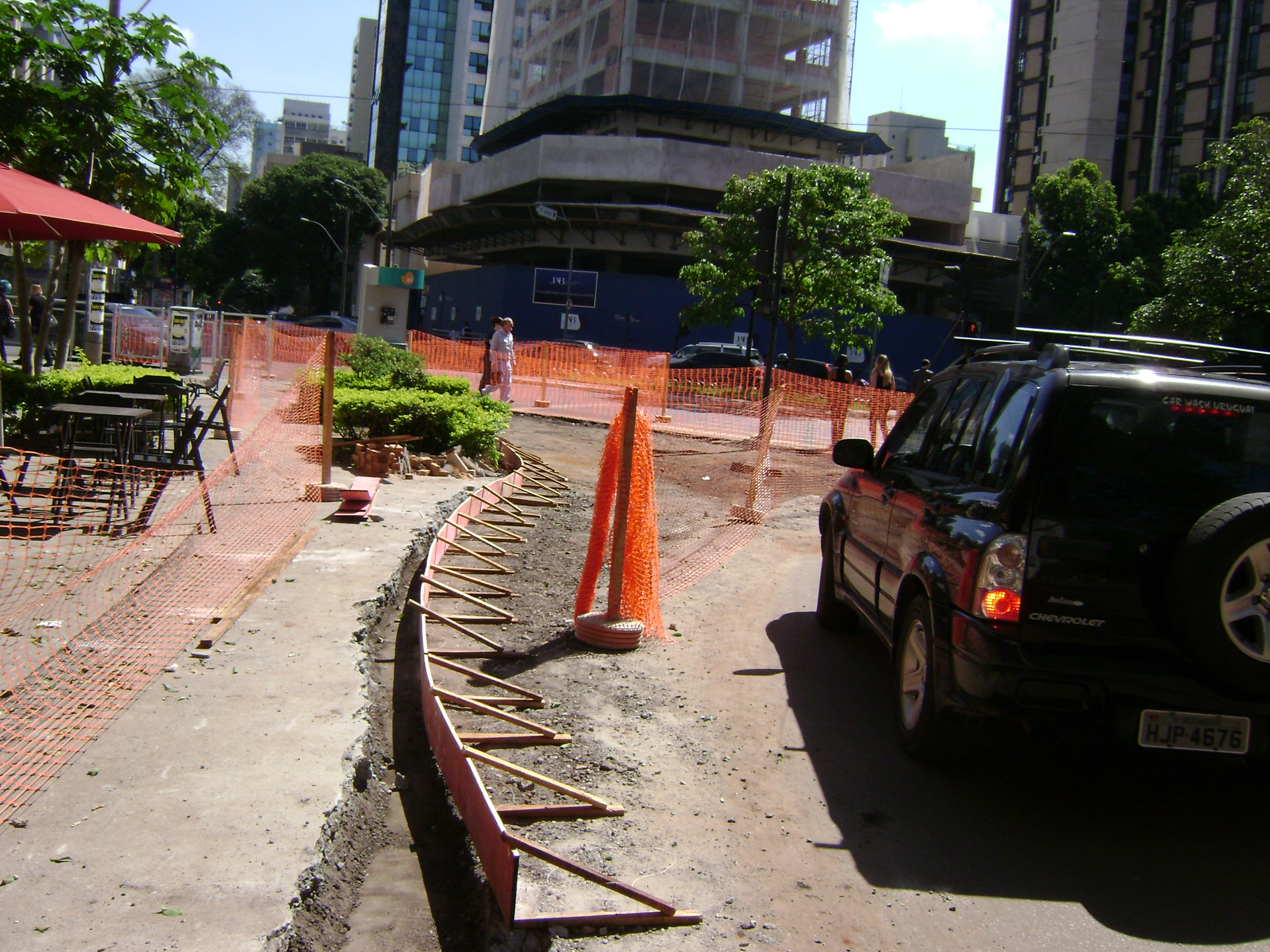

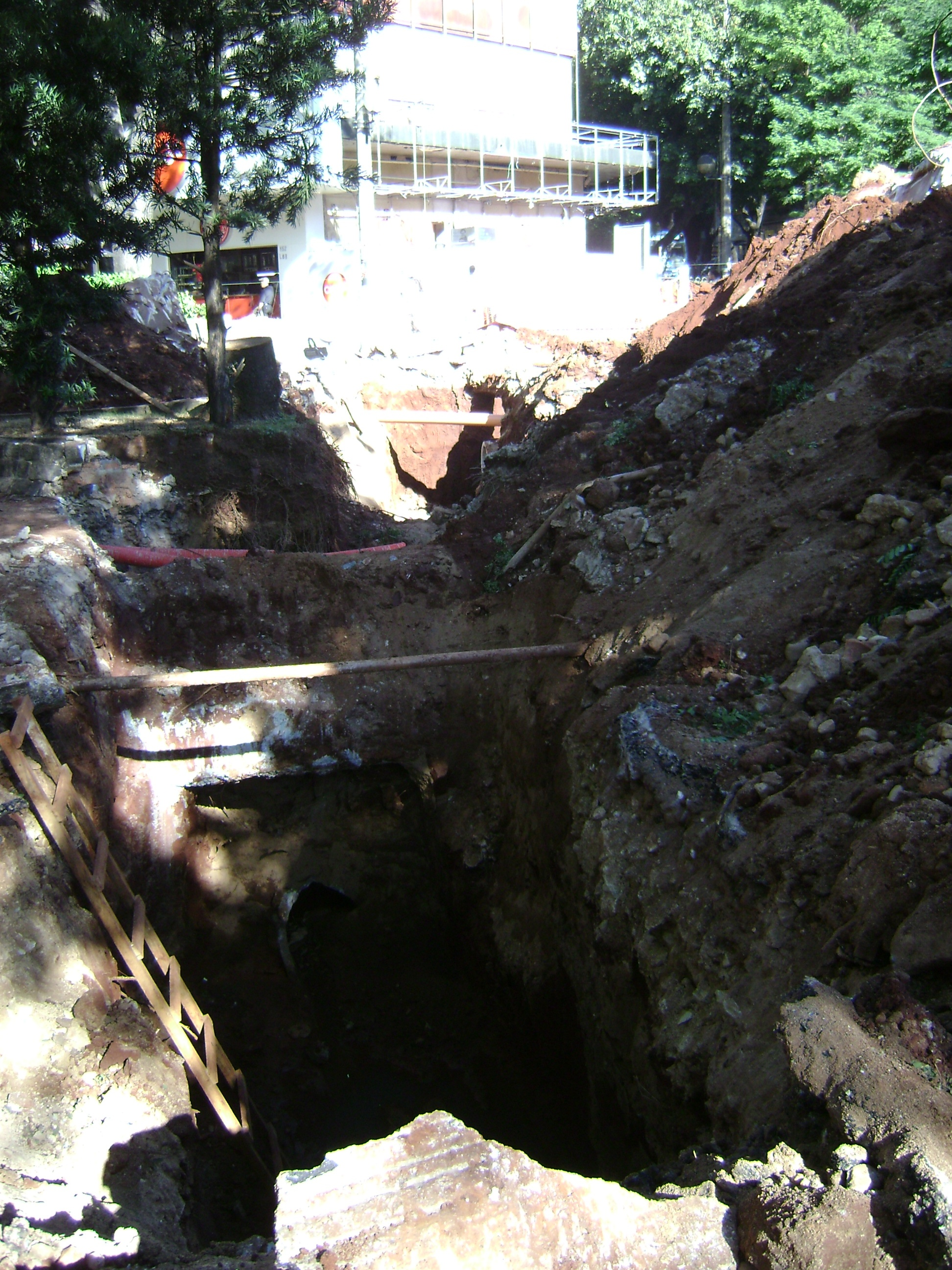

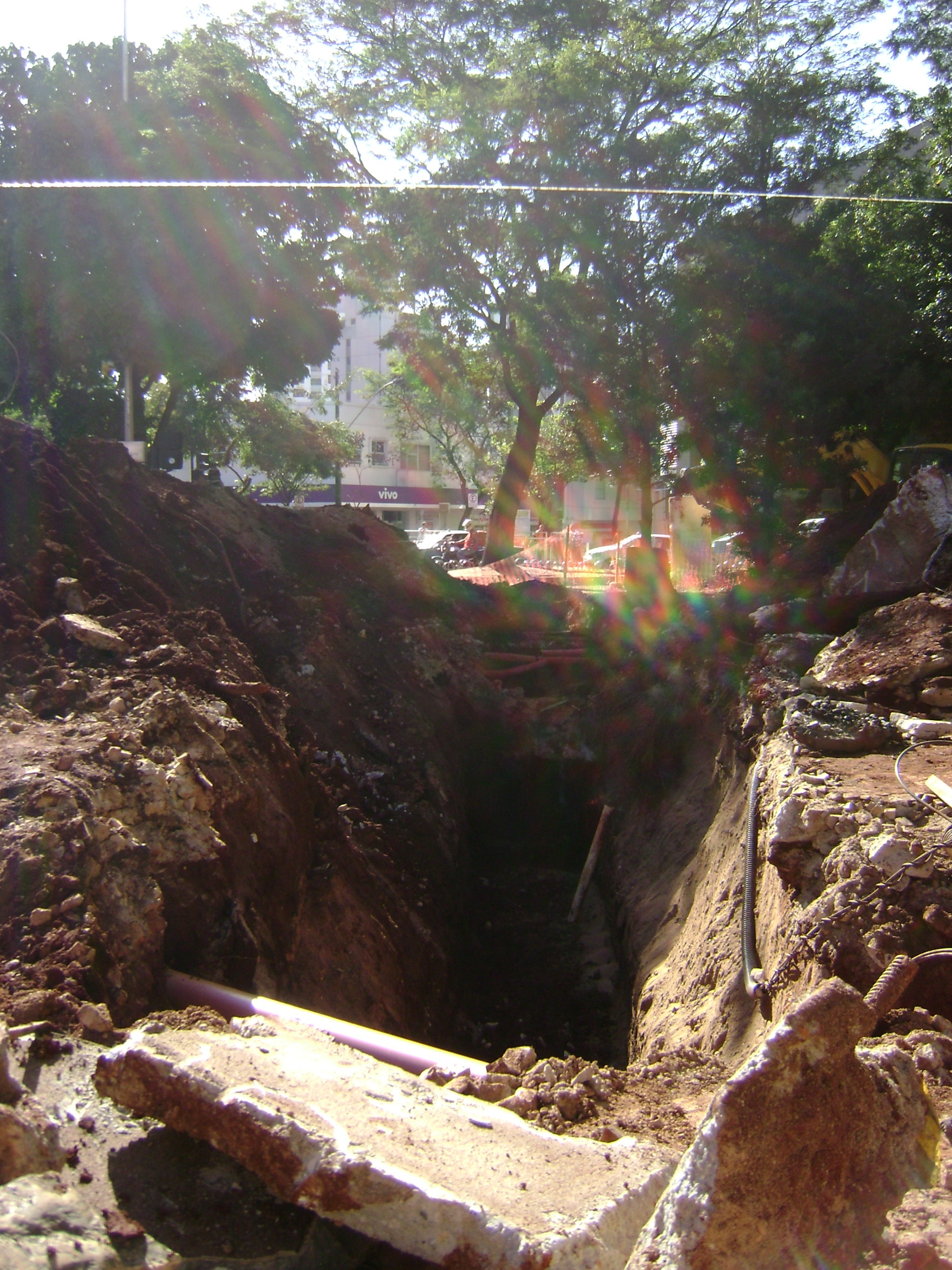

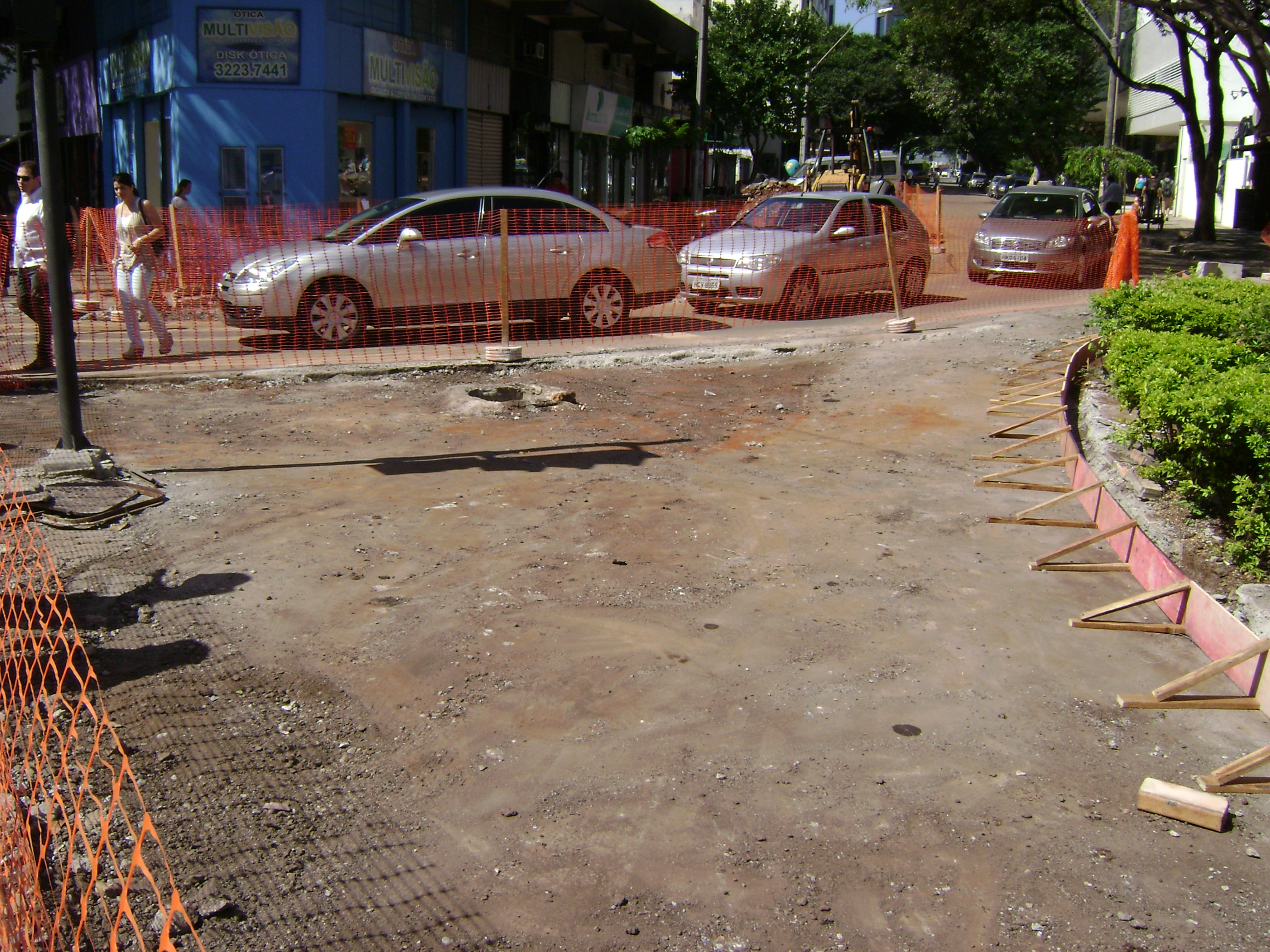

== See also ==
- Savassi
