= Colégio Santo Antônio =

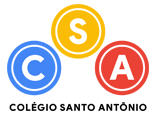

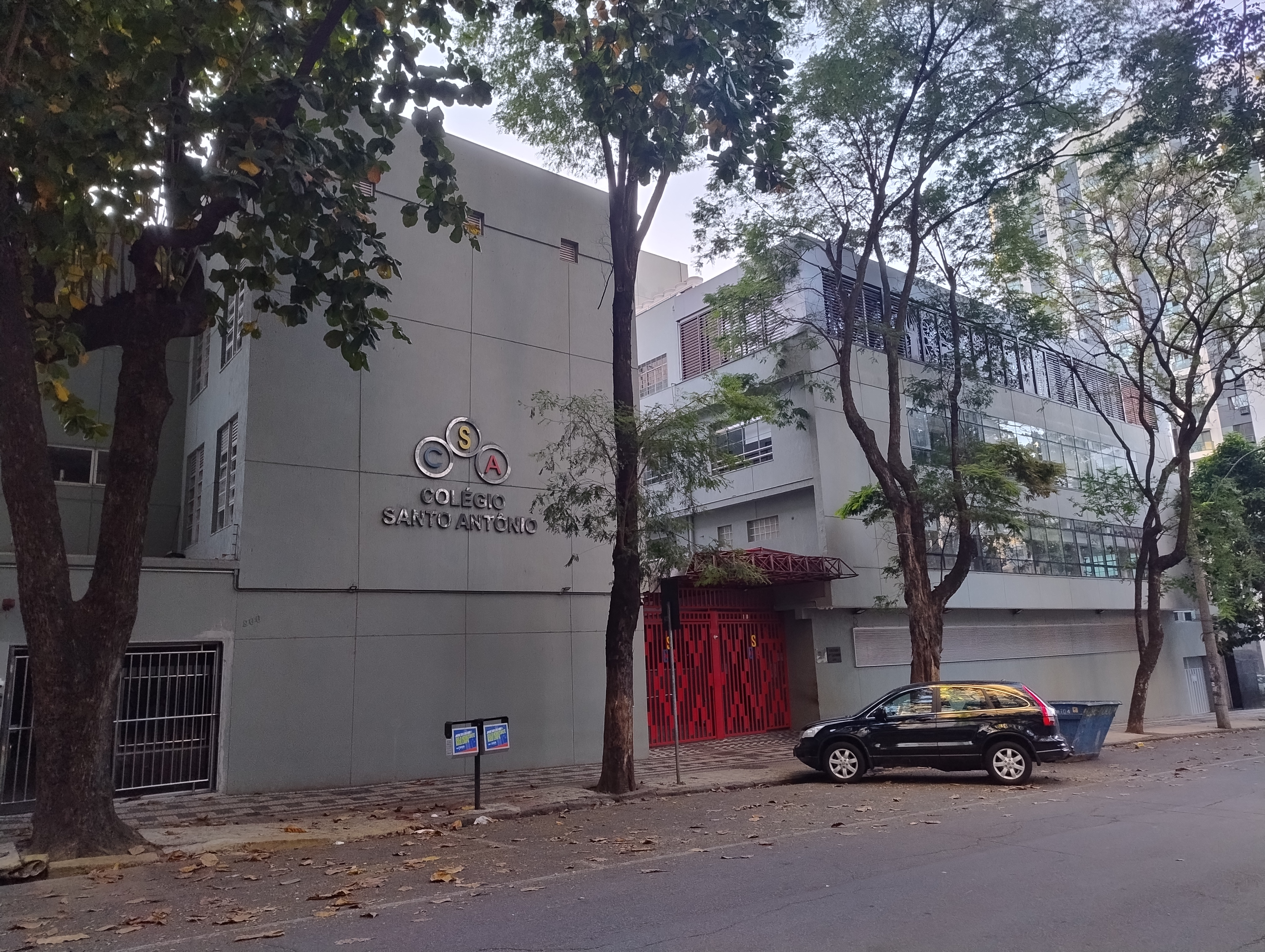

Location
- Rua Pernambuco, 880, Savassi; Belo Horizonte, Minas Gerais; Brazil
- 19.93464682653335°S 43.93500437674077°W

Information
- School type: Primary and secondary school
- Motto: Um colégio para toda a vida (A school for life)
- Religious affiliations: Roman Catholic (Franciscan)
- Founded: May 1, 1909
- Language: Portuguese
- Schedule type: Yearly
- Colours: Blue, yellow, red
- Phone: (31) 2123 9300
- Website: www.colegiosantoantonio.com.br

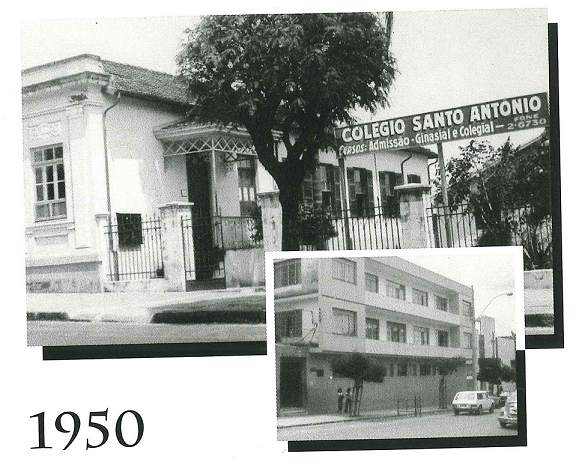
The school in 1950.

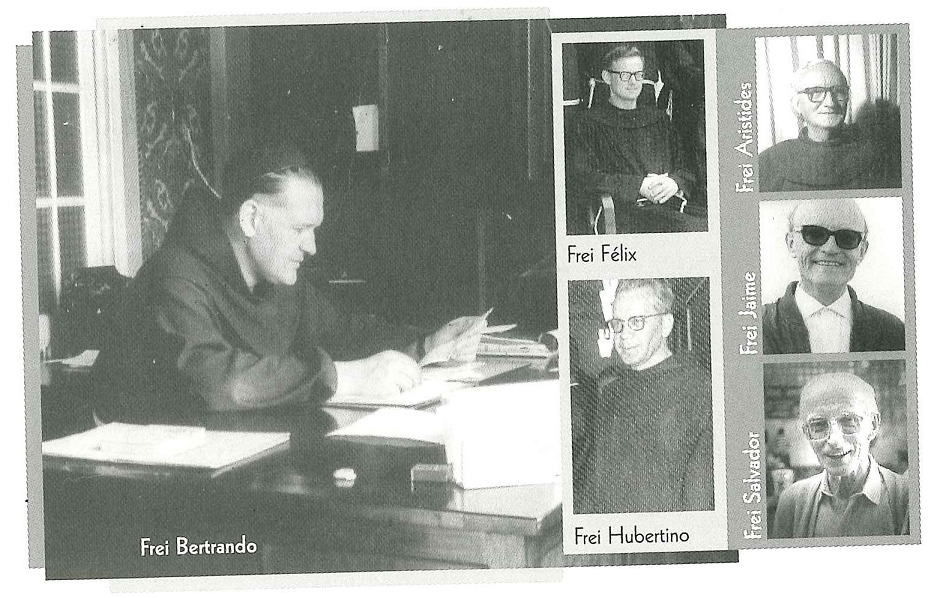
Friars who were part of the school's history.

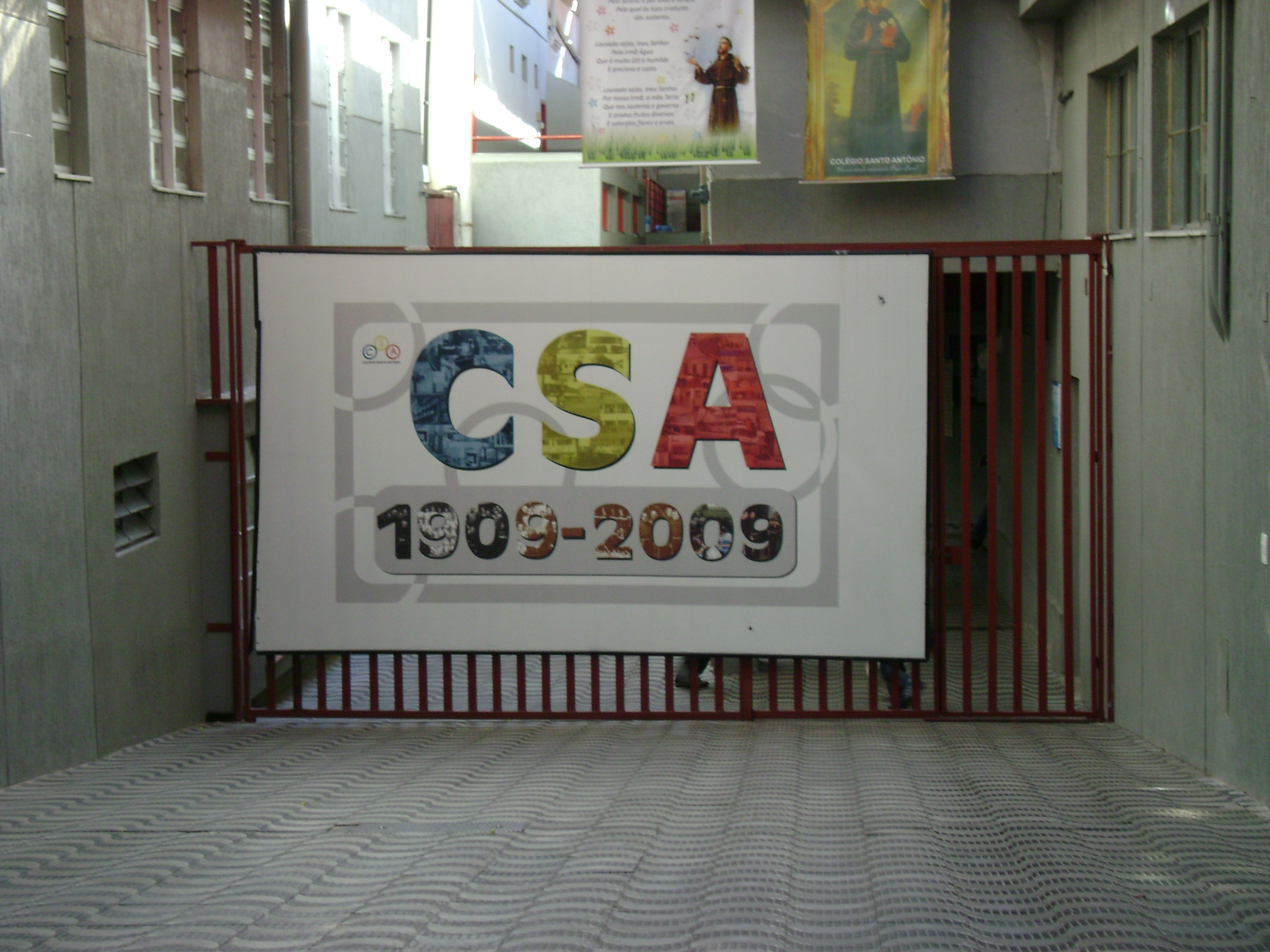
Banner celebrating the school's centenary.

Colégio Santo Antônio (St. Anthony School) is a private Catholic Franciscan primary and secondary school located in the Savassi neighborhood of Belo Horizonte, Minas Gerais, Brazil. It is maintained by Casa de Santo Antonio (St. Anthony House). The institution has stood out in the Brazilian scenario for its excellent performance in the National High School Exam (ENEM), leading the ranking of schools with more than 100 students who took the exam. It is also a reference in approvals in entrance exams for several universities in the country and around the world.

Regardless of the number of students or the calculation method, the school ranked first in the Enem in Minas Gerais for four consecutive years: 2022, 2023, 2024, and 2025.

== History ==
Colégio Santo Antônio was established at São João del Rei, Minas Gerais, on May 1, 1909, by the Order of Friars Minor. It distinguished itself as a benchmark of education, welcoming students from all over the country.

In the late 1940s, the school was moved to Belo Horizonte, the state capital, to better prepare students for the Federal University of Minas Gerais, then known as the University of Minas Gerais.

Under the direction of Brother Bertrando, Pedro Schretlen and others, the school was moved to 880 Pernambuco Street on February 17, 1950, where an inaugural mass was celebrated in a makeshift chapel. The school also began to support the autonomy of the new Franciscan province. That same year, the school added seven science classes, and offered its first gym classes two years later.

In 1972, the unit of São João del Rei (High School San Antonio) ceased operations, making the building available for other public projects. In the old building, the Municipal Foundation of São João del Rei was started, which was one of the entities forming the Federal University of São João del-Rei. The Franciscans kept the school true to the principles of the order. After the death of Brother Bertrando, the school went under the direction of Frei Felix, from 1959 to 1962. From 1962 to 1967, Frei Humbertino Backes, Eduardo Copray and Giraldi oversaw school operations. Frei Aristides Kasbergen managed the school from 1967 to 1984, Fr Dario Campos from 1984 to 1991, and Hilário Meekes from 1991 to 2000.

In 2002 and 2003, Zé Roberto and Pedro discontinued their leadership of the school, and Frei Flávio Silva Vieira continued the work in the area of pastoral care. Frei Jonas Nogueira da Costa took over the ministry in late 2006. Frei Jacir de Freitas Faria has been Director General and Pedagogical since late 2006. Since late 2007, Frei Alexsandro Rufino da Silva has been the Director of Administration and Finance.

In 2018 the educational institution became a member of the UNESCO Associated Schools Program Network (PEA / Unesco).

=== Timeline ===
- 1909: Colégio Santo Antônio was founded in São João del-Rei;
- 1950: The Belo Horizonte campus opened, initially offering the curso científico, a secondary-school program focused on the sciences;
- 1964: Santo Antônio Parish opened in the Funcionários neighborhood;
- 1968: A fire damaged the Ginásio Santo Antônio in São João del-Rei;
- 1972: The school permanently ceased operations in São João del-Rei;
- 1977: The Coleginho opened to accommodate the first years of primary education;
- 1998: A new building was constructed for the Coleginho;
- 2008: The CSA Avançado program was introduced for secondary-school students, allowing them to undertake extracurricular introductory research projects in several fields;
- 2009: Colégio Santo Antônio celebrated its centenary;
- 2012: German was added to the curriculum as an alternative to Spanish, through a partnership with the Goethe-Institut and the PASCH initiative;
- 2014: Robotics and the CSA Avançado program were added to the curriculum;
- 2025: Mandarin Chinese was added to the curriculum as an alternative to Spanish and German.

== Characteristics ==
Colégio Santo Antônio (CSA) is maintained by the Association of Franciscan Education and Welfare. It belongs to the Province of Santa Cruz, internal division of the Order of the Friars Minor, founded in 1209 by St. Francis of Assisi.

The directors of the school are Frei Jacir de Freitas Faria (Educational and General), Fr Alexsandro Rufino da Silva (Administrative and Financial) and Frei Jonas Nogueira da Costa (Pastoral). On May 1, 2009, the school had been in operation for 100 years.

A series of extra-curricular activities in sports and the arts are offered by the school. Students take classes in guitar, violin, flute, ballet, jazz, folk dancing, soccer, handball, volleyball, and basketball. The school also has three choirs and an experimental orchestra.

The school won fourth place in Brazil in the High School Nacional Exam (ENEM) 2008.

=== Campuses ===
The school has a primary education facility (Coleginho), located at Rua Pernambuco, 732 (Funcionários neighborhood). Here students study from 1st through 5th grade.

A combined middle school and high school is located at Rua Pernambuco, 880 (Savassi neighborhood). Here students study the 6th through 9th grade, before advancing to the high school.

=== Student Council ===
The St. Anthony's Student Council is very active and is supported by the principals and teachers. During election periods, the Council organises awareness-raising campaigns for students, promoting debates between candidates for elective office and inviting judges of the Regional Electoral Court (Tribunal Regional Eleitoral de Minas Gerais) to give lectures.

In the cultural sector, the Council and its Department of Internal Affairs develop projects such as "Debate Theatre" and "Reading the Classics". The council also promotes the Festival of Bands at recess time. Students vote for the best bands and the winners get to play in the "Ice Cream Festival", which is also sponsored by the council.

== See also ==
- Education in Brazil
- List of schools in Brazil
