= Savassi =

- Neighbourhood
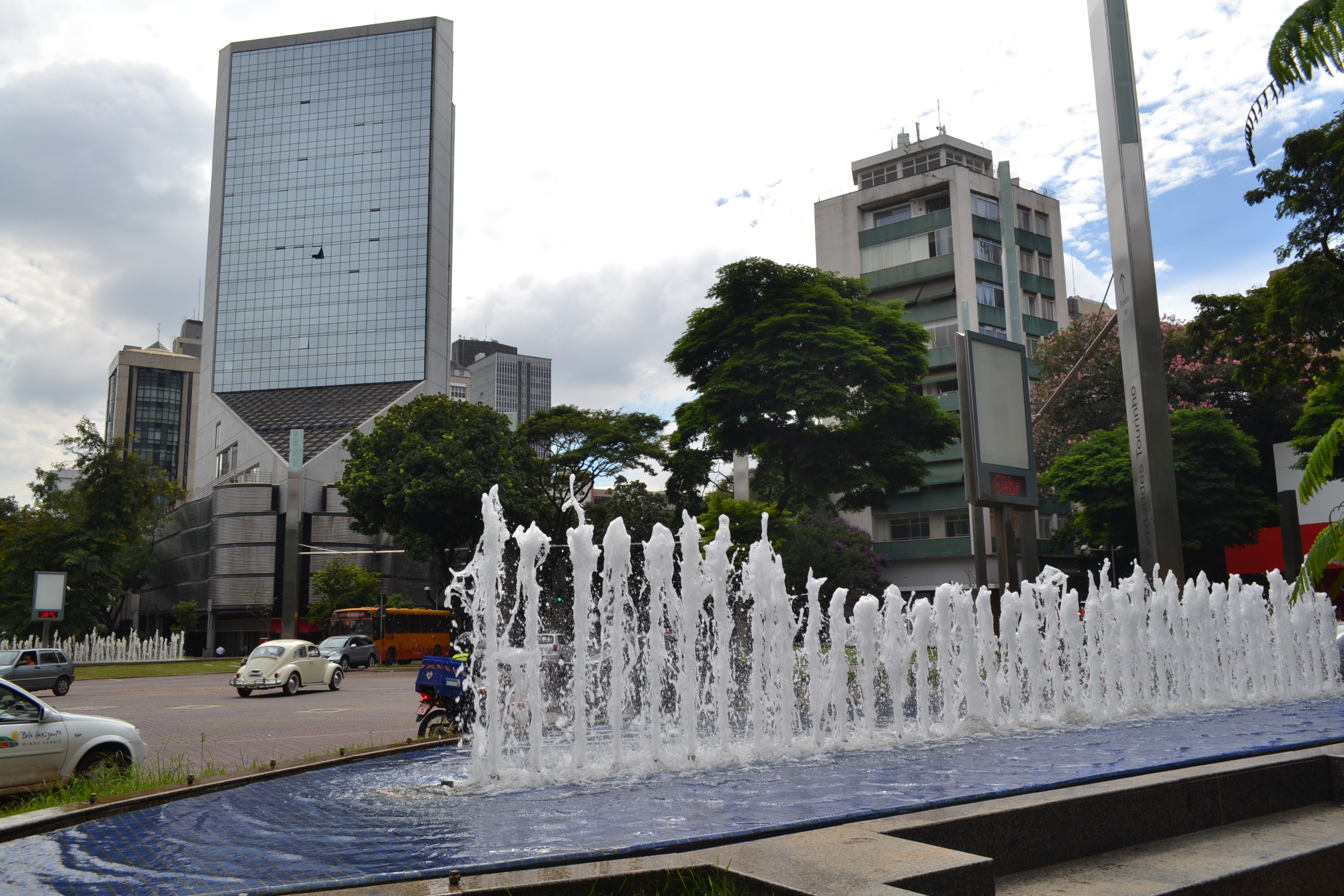
- Partial view of Savassi skyline
- Location in Belo Horizonte
- Coordinates: 19.938333°S 43.935833°W
- Country: Brazil
- State: Minas Gerais
- City: Belo Horizonte

Population (2016)
  - Total: 11,772

Savassi is a neighborhood in Belo Horizonte, Brazil. It is located at the Central-South zone city district. Savassi is known for having a large number of bars, pubs, clubs, cafés, bistros, diners, restaurants, nightlife and shopping commerce. The region is regarded as one of the most prestigious and sought-after areas in Belo Horizonte.

== History ==
Savassi takes its name from an Italian family, which owned a bakery in the neighborhood's main square, by that time known by its original name, Praça Diogo de Vasconcelos. In the mid-1930s the bakery was named after the family's last name. Then, the square got known as Savassi, and later the entire region was known as well. After that Mayor made Savassi a neighbourhood and not more a Square. Savassi Bakery was the point to people to meet and eat delicious breads and pastries.

For long it was a region inside Funcionários neighborhood. In 2006, it was dismembered by the Town House before the meeting of the Inter-American Development Bank, which was to happen that same year in the city.Now Funcionários is a bit further down south and Savassi is the neighbourhood where is Patio Savassi up to Minas Tênis Clube.

== Main venues ==
Currently, Savassi is bounded south by the Contorno Avenue, where is located one of the trendiest and most upscale shopping malls in the city, the Pátio Savassi; east, by the Afonso Pena Avenue; north by Brasil Avenue; northwest by the Praça da Liberdade (Liberty Square); west by Rua da Bahia. Savassi is neighbors with some of the most affluent areas of Belo Horizonte, like Funcionários, at the northeast; Boa Viagem, at the north; Lourdes, the wealthiest and most expensive residential district in the city, at the west; and Santo Antônio, São Pedro, Carmo and Cruzeiro, at the southern border.

Some major streets in Savassi are: the Afonso Pena Avenue, Getúlio Vargas Avenue, Cristóvão Colombo Avenue, Brasil Avenue, Rua da Bahia and Contorno Avenue. The neighborhood is a CRECI A List area in Belo Horizonte, and has one of the most expensive square-feet in town. It is home to many of the most prestigious and selective private schools in the city, most of them Catholic Schools, like the Colégio Santo Antônio, Colégio Sagrado Coração (Sacred-Heart School), Colégio Marista São José, Colégio Padre Machado, and others. There is also the Architecture School of UFMG, the Social Sciences School of PUC-Minas and the campuses of many other top-rated Brazilian universities and colleges. The elite comes to Savassi to shop, to attend the several art galleries, exhibitions, fairs and public parties; to sit at the ever-full cafés and bars; dance at the most-wanted private parties and clubs; to see and to be seen. The area is also known for being the most straightforward in town, being home for every single type of culture. Hipsters, emo and rockers are around in large numbers. The Human Development Index in the neighborhood is one of the highest in Southeast Brazil, as well as its per-capita income, and Gross Enrolment Ratio.

== Restructuring ==
From 2011 onward the neighborhood underwent a restructuring of Praça da Savassi, implementation of a cycle path and construction of an underground car park.
