= Rescuer City =

"Rescuer City" Honorable mention
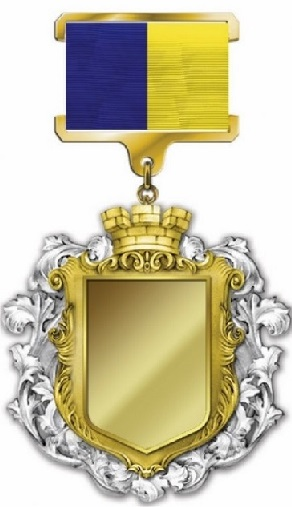
- Medal granted to designated Rescuer Cities
- Awarded for: Cities whose residents provide significant humanitarian protection and assistance to Ukrainian refugees and support Ukrainian sovereignty during the Russian invasion of Ukraine
- Country: Ukraine
- Presented by: President of Ukraine
- Eligibility: Cities of foreign countries
- First award: May 22, 2022
- Final award: May 26, 2026

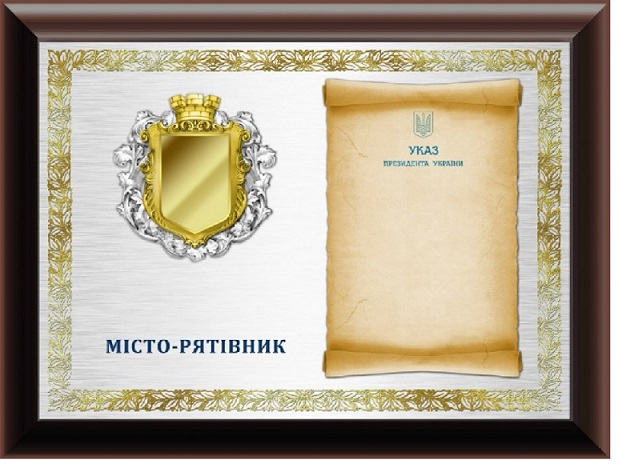
Commemorative plaque granted to Rescuer Cities

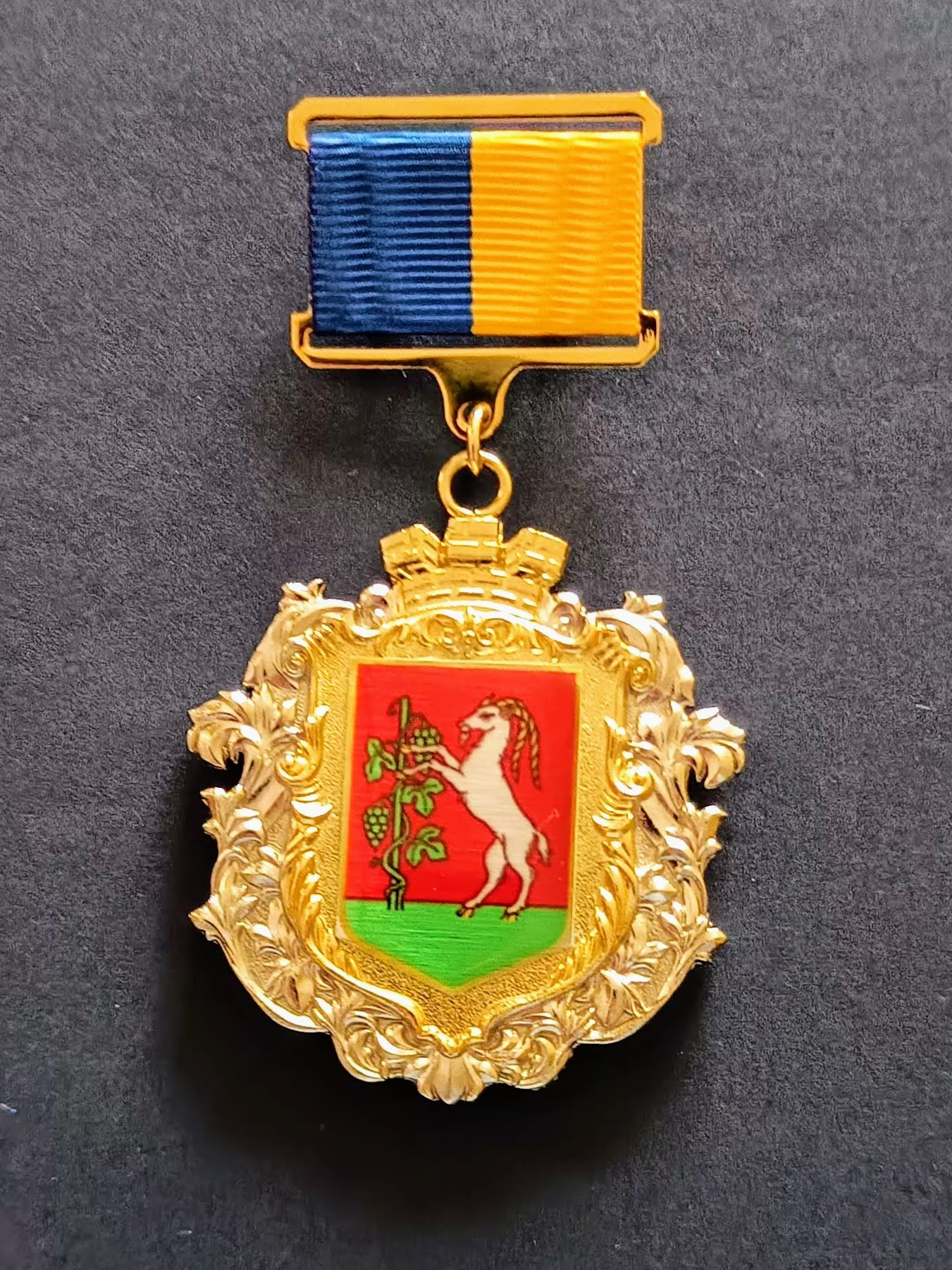
Medal granted to the city of Lublin

The Rescuer City (Ukrainian: Місто-рятівник) distinction is an honorary award established by the President of Ukraine Volodymyr Zelenskyy to celebrate the humanitarianism, charity, and solidarity that different foreign cities shared with the Ukrainian people to defend the ideals of freedom, peace, and democracy. The award also represents the support given the city's residents to Ukraine's defense of its national independence and sovereignty while resisting against Russia's armed aggression during its invasion of Ukraine.

The distinction is given to cities of foreign states whose residents provided substantial humanitarian protection and other kinds of assistance to citizens of Ukraine forced to leave the nation during the invasion, as well as for those who gave significant support to the nation of Ukraine in its defense of its national identity, culture, and self-determination.

== History ==
- The "Rescuer City" honorary distinction was established on 22 May 2022 by the decree of the President of Ukraine Volodymyr Zelenskyy.
- The Polish city of Rzeszów was the first to be honored with the distinction on 22 May 2022.
- On 4 April 2023, a decree by Volodymyr Zelenskyy approved of specific regulations towards how cities are selected and how the honorary distinction is granted, as well as regulations for the design of the award including drawings and the basic model of the award's commemorative plaque.

== List of Rescuer Cities ==
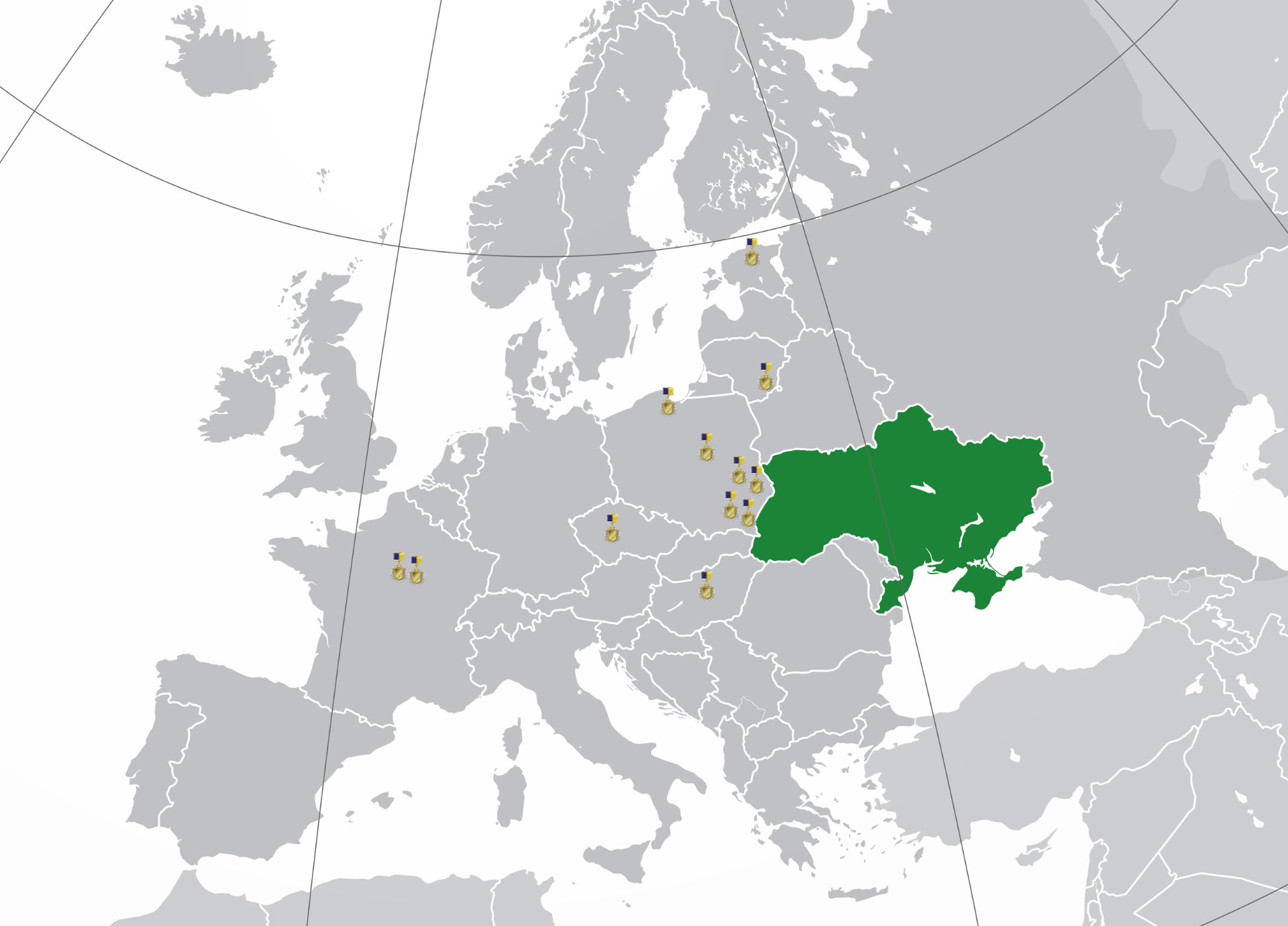
Rescuer Cities depicted on the map of Europe

No	Emblem	City	Country	Date of bestowment
1	Coat of arms for Rzeszów, white cross on a blue background	Rzeszów	Poland	May 22, 2022
2	Przemyśl Coat of Arms	Przemyśl	Poland	July 11, 2022
3	Coat of arms of Prague	Prague (Czech: Praha)	Czech Republic	October 28, 2022
4	Coat of arms of Vilnius	Vilnius	Lithuania	January 24, 2023
5	Lublin Coat of arms	Lublin	Poland	April 3, 2023
6	Chełm coat of arms	Chełm	Poland	April 3, 2023
7	Coat of arms of Paris	Paris	France	April 18, 2023
8	Coat of arms of Warsaw	Warsaw	Poland	January 13, 2025
9	Coat of arms of Budapest	Budapest	Hungary	May 26, 2026
10	Coat of arms of Budapest	Gdańsk	Poland	May 26, 2026

== Award description ==
- The medal of honor has the form of a cartouche with a mural crown on a background of acanthus leaves. The cartouche contains the coat of arms of the city.
- The medal is made of copper alloys. The image of the cartouche and the crown are covered with galvanic plated gold, while the acanthus leaves are covered with nickel.
- On the reverse side of the medal, the cartouche bears the inscription "<city name> МІСТО-РЯТІВНИК". (English: "<city name> RESCUER CITY")
- Images of the cartouche, crown and acanthus leaves are carved in relief.
- The size of the medal is: height — 50 mm, width — 47.5 mm.
- The medal of honor is connected to a block made of copper alloys with a coating of galvanic plated gold. The upper and lower parts of the block have slots through which the surface of the block is covered with tape. The block's size is: height — 23 mm, width — 32 mm. On the reverse side of the block, there is a fastener for attaching the city flag to the medal.
- The ribbon of the medal is silk moiré, with longitudinal stripes of blue and yellow colors. The width of the tape is 28 mm, while the width of each strip is 14 mm.
- The commemorative plaque for the honor has the shape of a horizontal rectangle. The base of the plaque is made of laminated composite material, on which a rectangular plate of white metal is placed.
- The right half of the plate depicts an unfolded scroll with the text of the Decree of the President of Ukraine on the awarding of the honorary designation.
- In the left half of the plate, an honorary designation without a block is depicted, below it is an inscription in two lines in blue letters: "<city name> МІСТО-РЯТІВНИ". (English: "<city name> RESCUER CITY").
- On the edge of the plate, there is an ornament shaped like golden laurel leaves.
- The size of the commemorative plaque is 220×300 mm.

== See also ==
- Hero City of Ukraine
