= Halytska Square =

Square in the Shevchenkivskyi District of Kyiv, Ukraine

Coordinates: 50.4469°N 30.4922°E

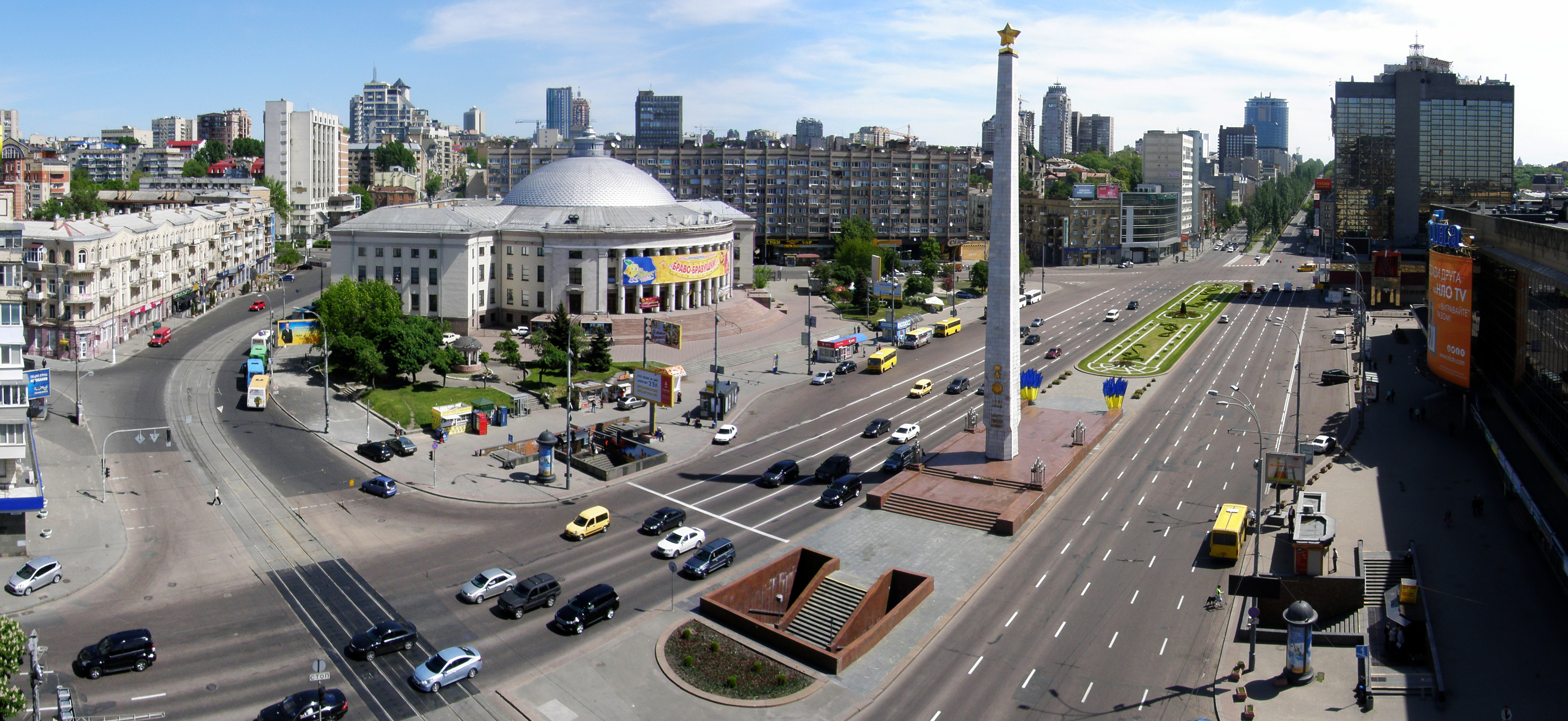
- Eastward view of Halytska Square in May 2014
- Interactive map of Halytska Square
- Native name: Площа Галицька (Ukrainian)
- Type: square
- Location: Shevchenkivskyi District, Kyiv, Ukraine

Halytska Square (Ukrainian: Площа Галицька, lit. 'Galician Square', translit.: Ploshcha Halytska) in Kyiv, the capital of Ukraine, is a large square in the city. The square is in Shevchenkivskyi District and located on Kyiv's main westward thoroughfare (Prospect Beresteiskyi – Tarasa Shevchenka boulevard) being its one of the main transportation hubs.

== History ==
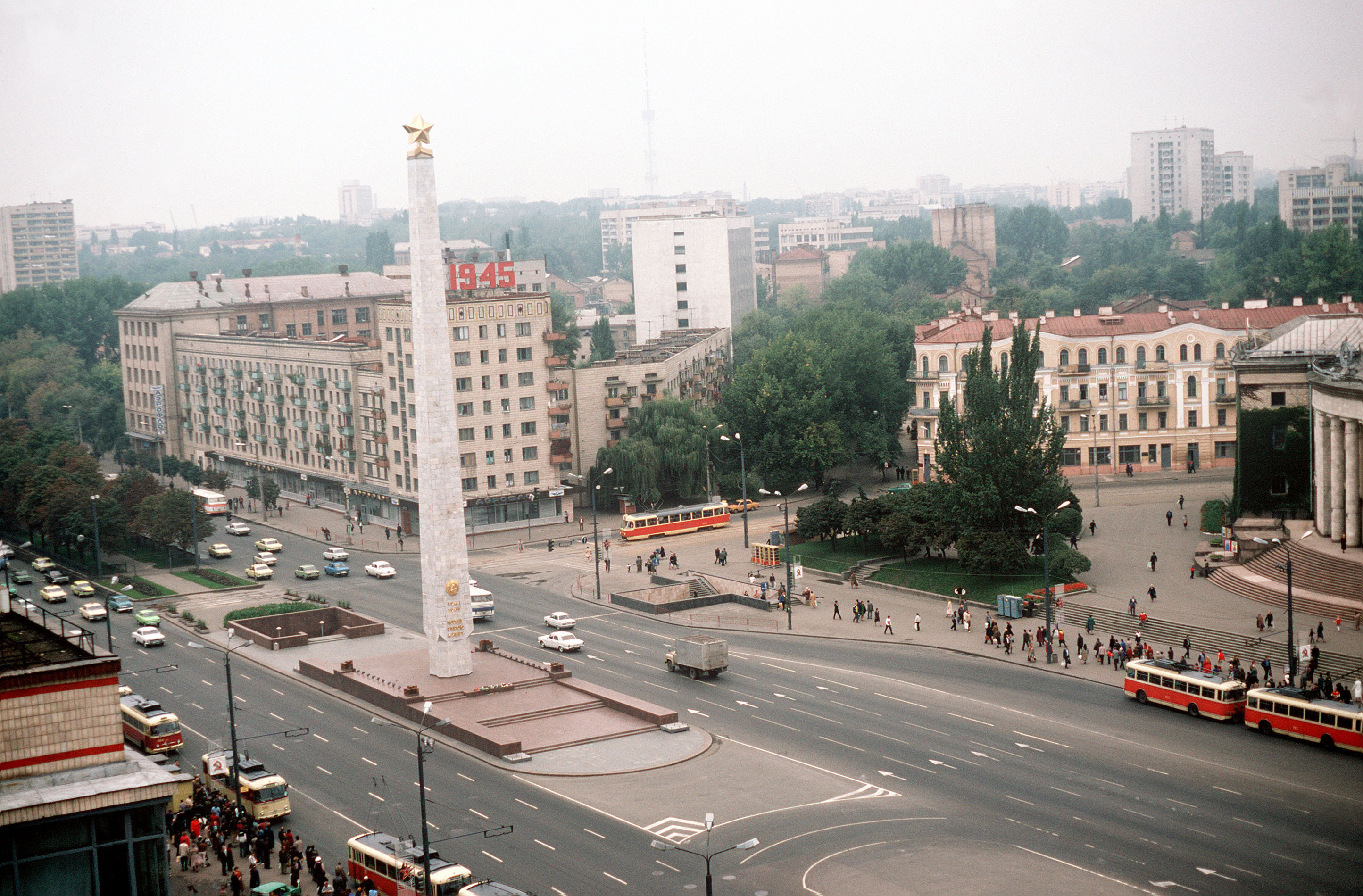
The Victory Square in Soviet times (1985), showing the Hero City monument

The square was established in the mid-19th century, when in February 1858 the Imperial Russian governor-general of Kyiv Illarion Vasilchikov allowed the Kyiv Jewish community to conduct trade fairs. From 1869 to 1952 the square was known as Halytska Square (Ukrainian: Галицька площа), being located towards Halychyna (Eastern Galicia). Before the 1950s this area was also commonly known as Yevbaz (Russian: Евбаз, literally: Jewish market), after the Jewish market that used to be there, but was dismantled at the end of the 1940s.

From 1952 to 2023, the square was named Victory Square (Ukrainian: Площа Перемоги, translit.: Ploshcha Peremohy). This name was dedicated to the Soviet victory over the Axis Powers in World War II.

On 9 February 2023, the Kyiv City Council renamed the square back to Halytska Square. On 15 September 2023, all Soviet medals and inscriptions in the Russian language on the surface of the obelisk were removed. Furthermore, the "1941" marking was changed to "1939", acknowledging the Ukrainian view of when World War II began. On 4 November, the communist star on top of the monument was also removed.

== Description ==
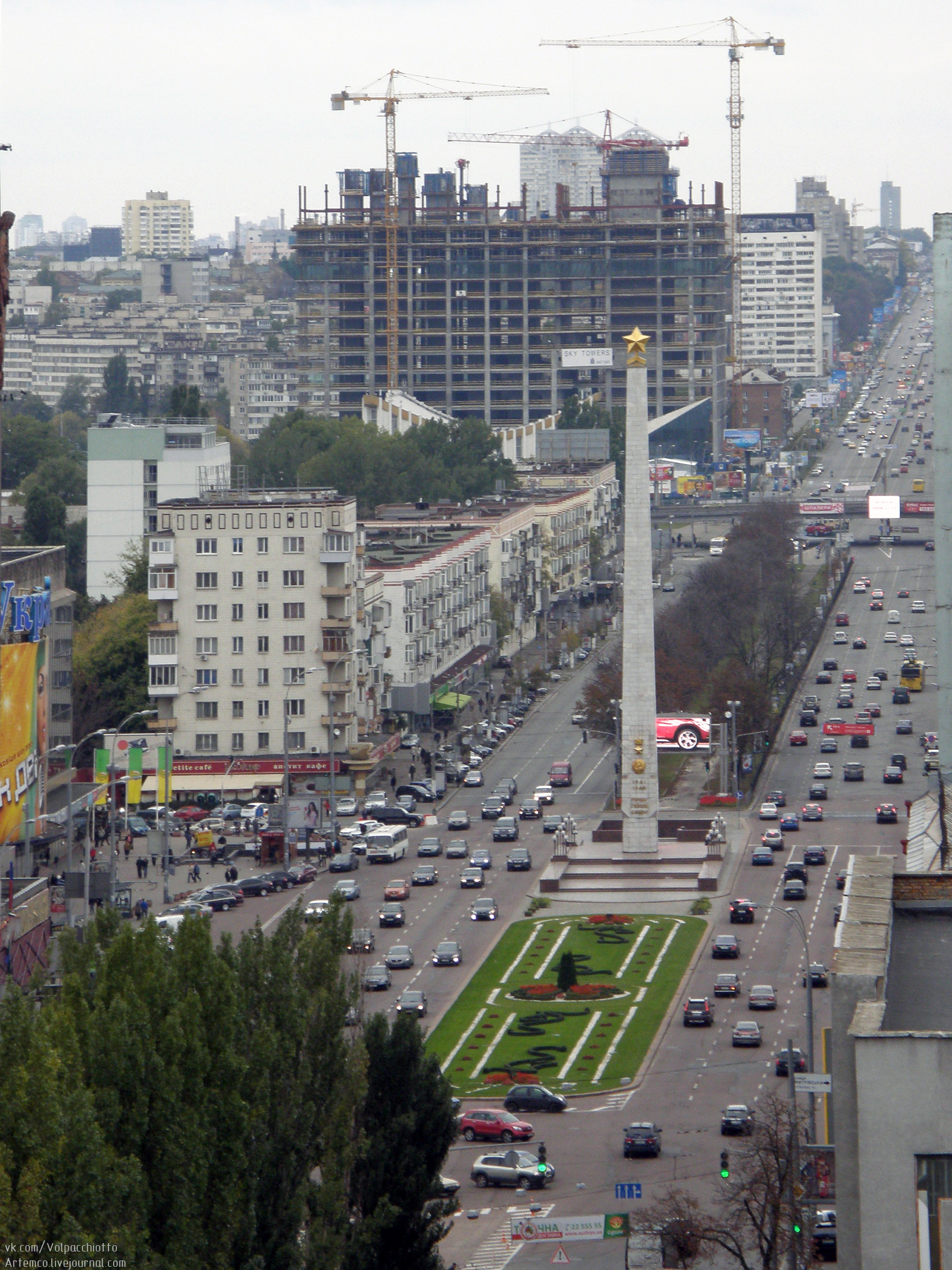
Westward view towards Prospect Beresteiskyi (2013)

Located on the opposite side of the Old Kyiv, the square is also one of extreme points of the neighborhood along with Maidan Nezalezhnosti. It is a crossing of several historic streets such as Saksahanskoho Street, Tarasa Shevchenka boulevard, Zhylianska street, Bulvarno-Kudriavska street - it is a beginning of Prospect Beresteiskyi - one of the longest and broadest avenues (parkway) in the city.

The most notable building and one of focal features of Halytska Square is the National Circus of Ukraine. This was formerly the site of the Church of John Chrysostom, of cast iron construction, which was destroyed by the Soviet regime in 1934. Among other notable buildings are the department store Ukraine and the Hotel Lybid.

The 30 m-tall (98 ft) Hero City monument, an obelisk situated on the square to commemorate the victory. In its original form it has a "hero star" (reflecting Kyiv's status as a Soviet Hero City) and "1941" and "1945" markings, marking the beginning and end years of World War II as recognised by Soviet history.

One of shops of the Kuznya na Rybalskomu separates Halytska Square from Vokzalna Square where the train station Kyiv-Pasazhyrskyi is located.

The square is served by numerous marshrutkas, trams, buses and trolley-buses.

== Gallery ==
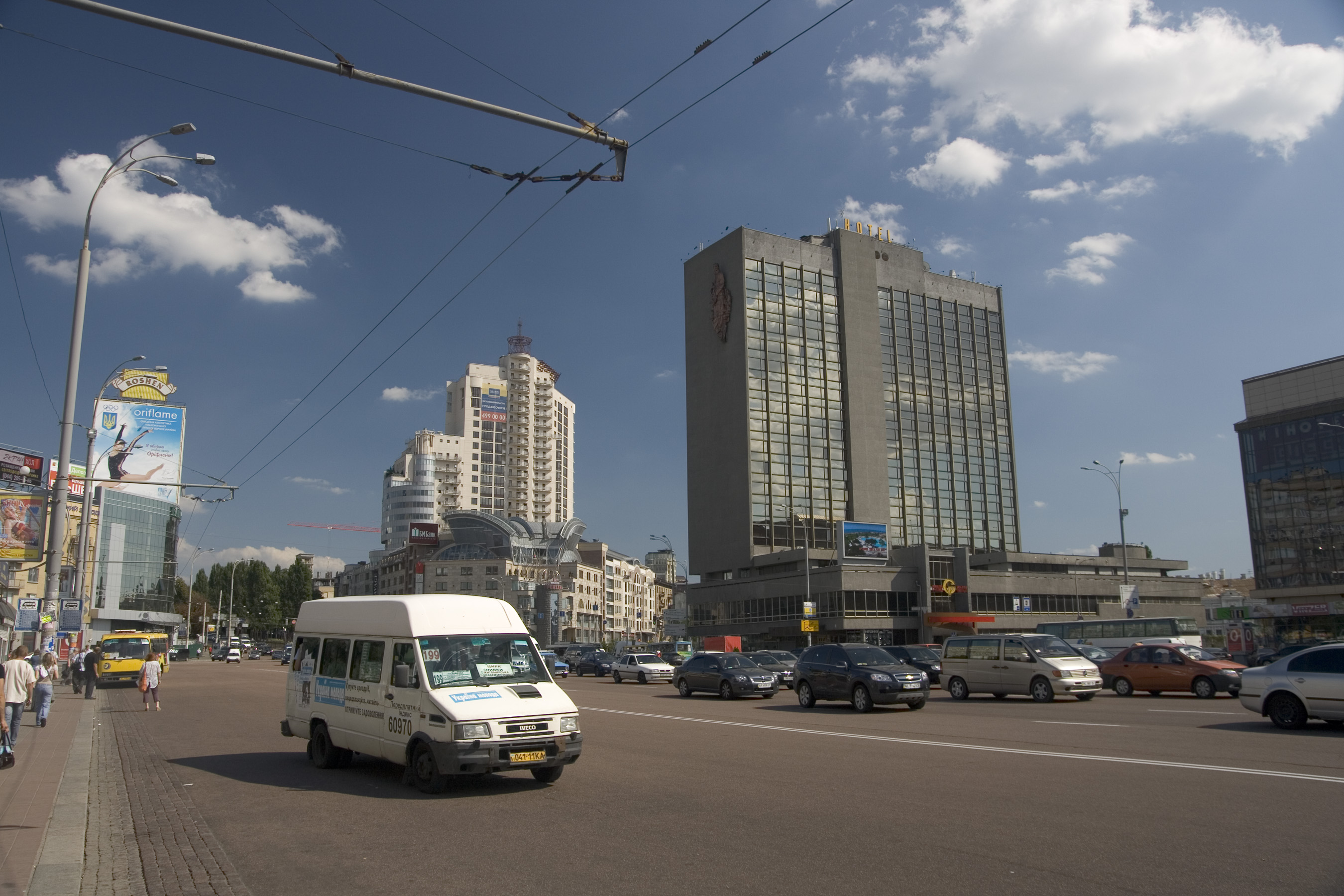
Darker building is the Hotel Lybid (eastward view)

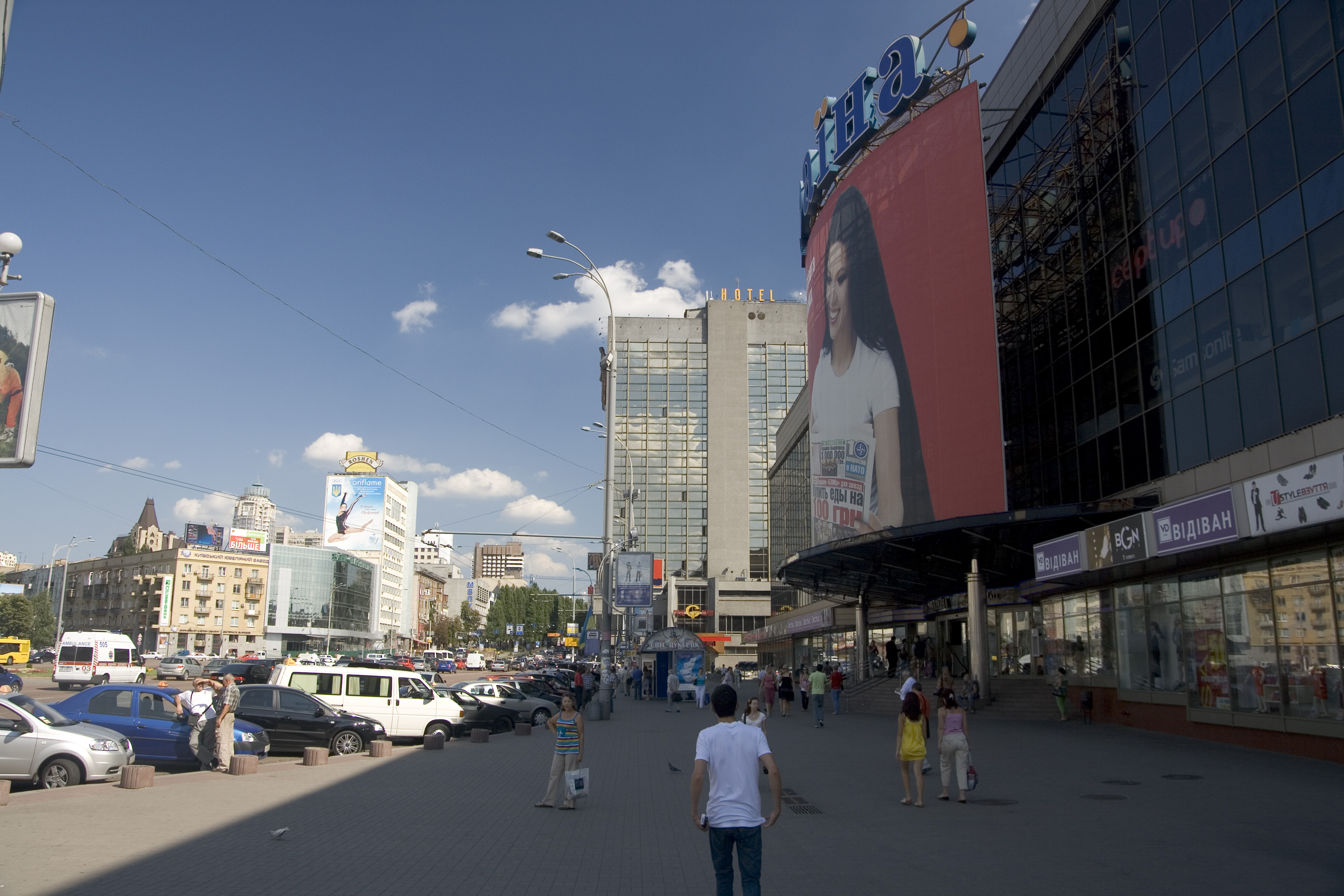
Right next to the "Ukraina" department store (eastward view)

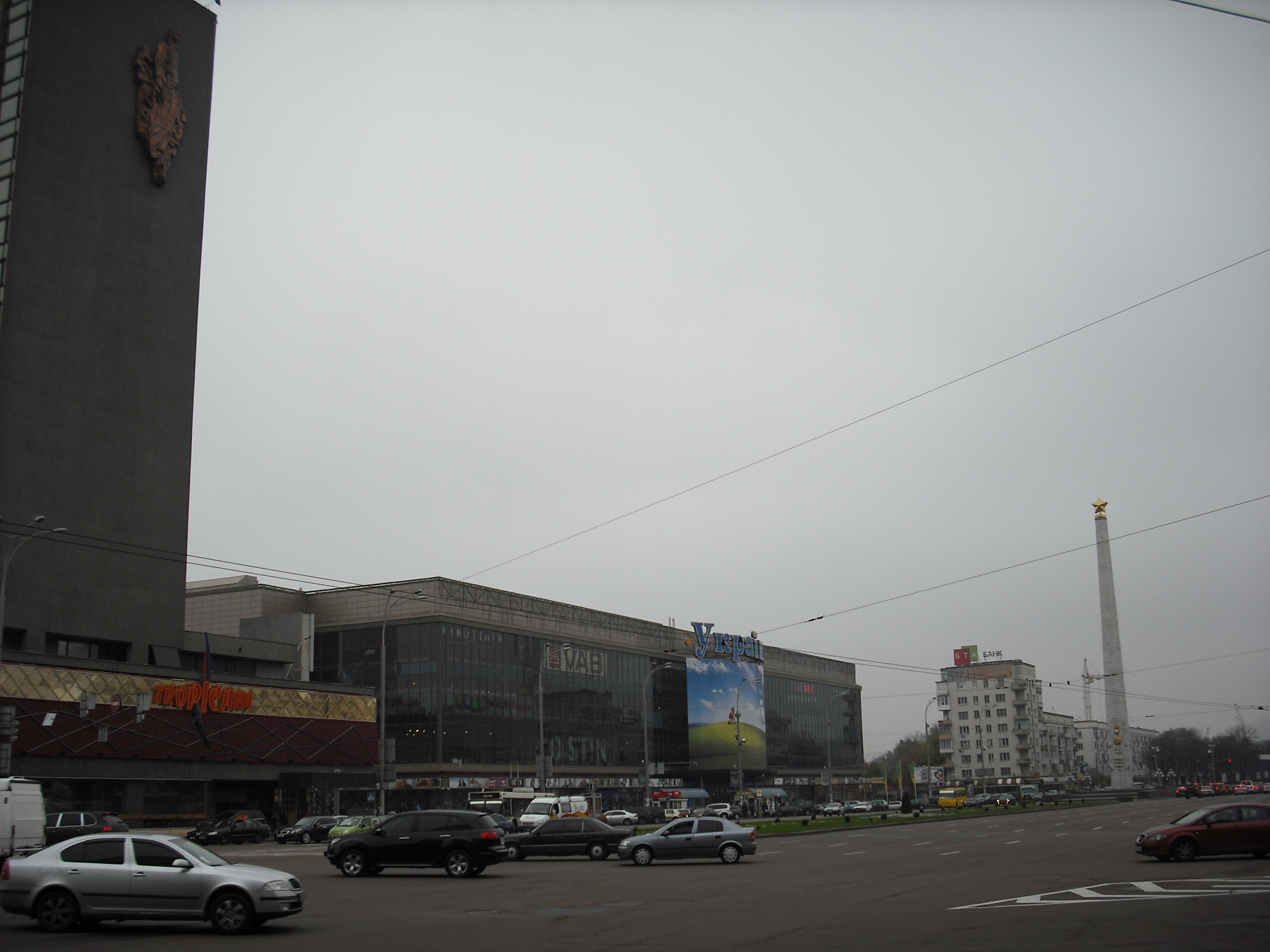
Ukraina department store between the Hotel Lybid and the Victory stele

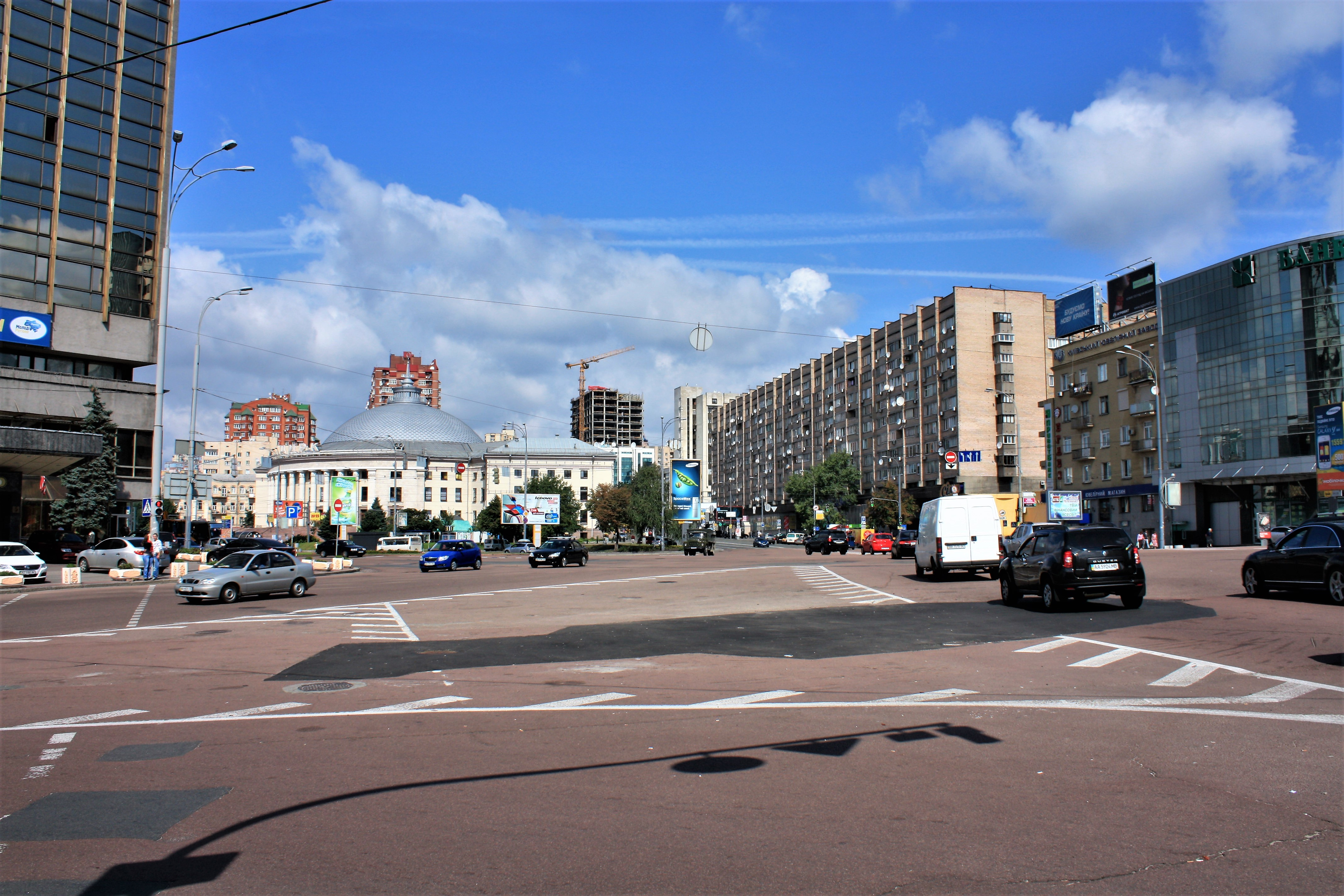
A perspective onto the Kyiv circus, to the left is the Hotel Lybid

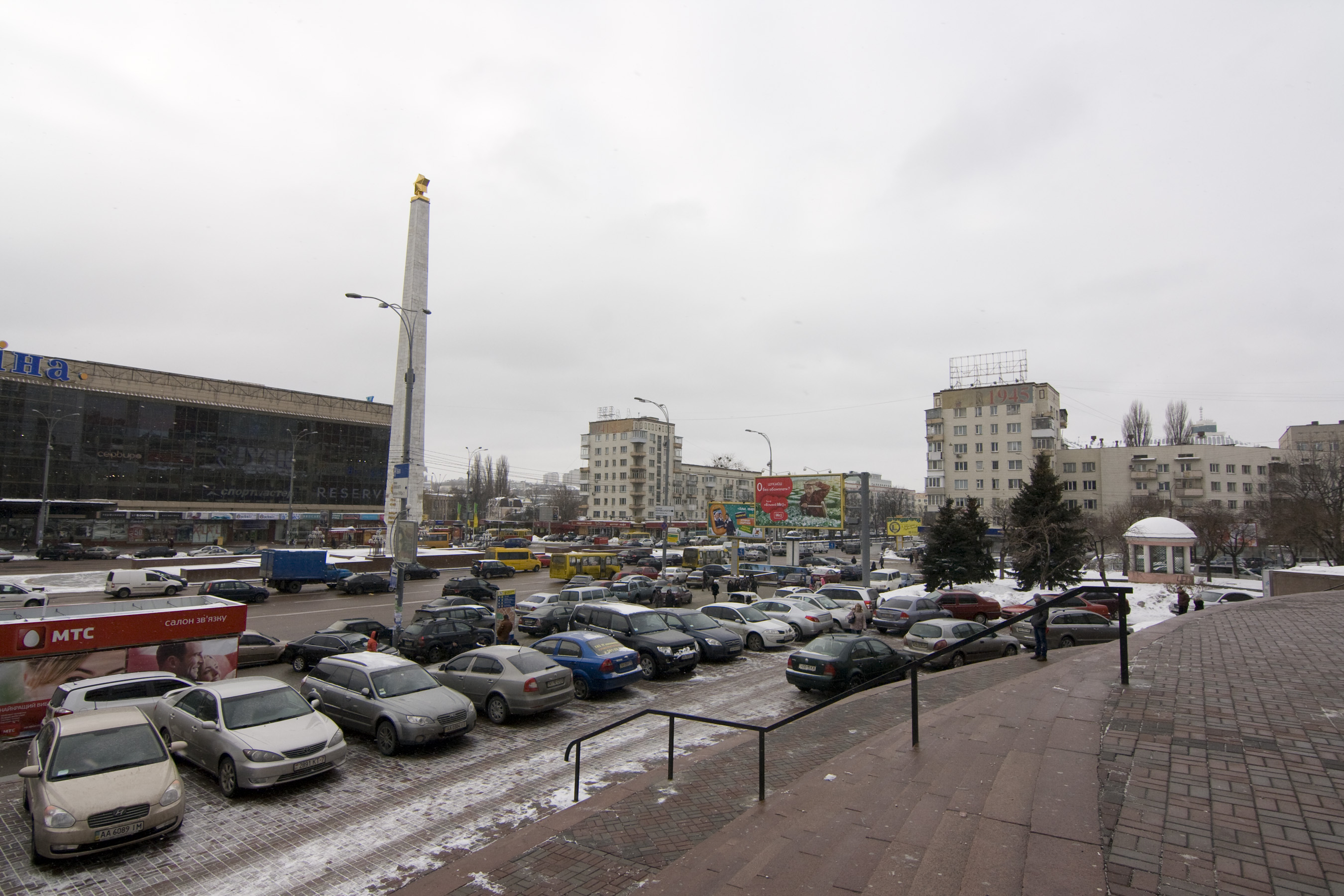
Right next to the Kyiv circus (westward view)

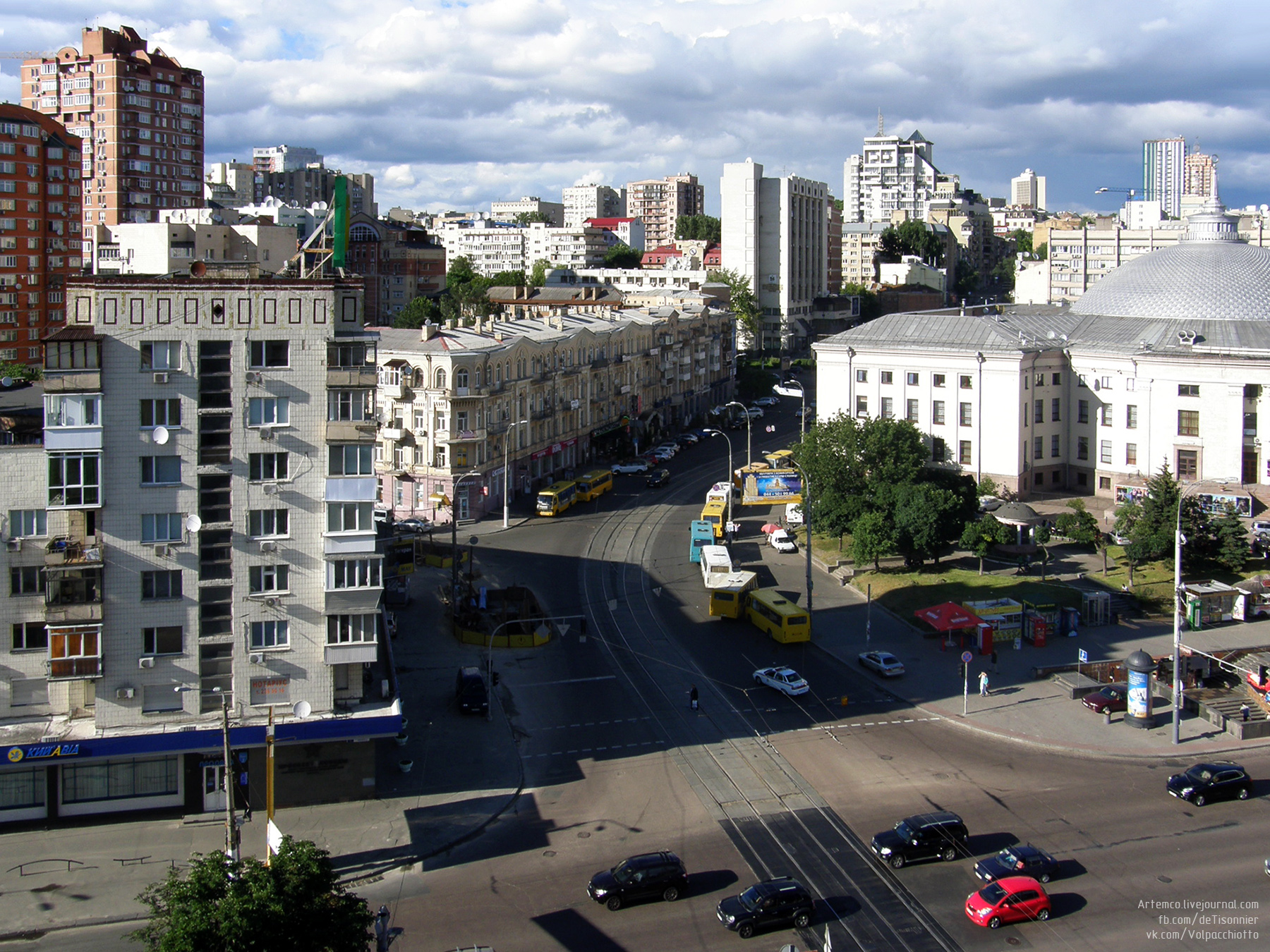
Beginning of Bulvarno—Kudriavska vulytsia (formerly Vorovskoho), to the right is the Kyiv circus

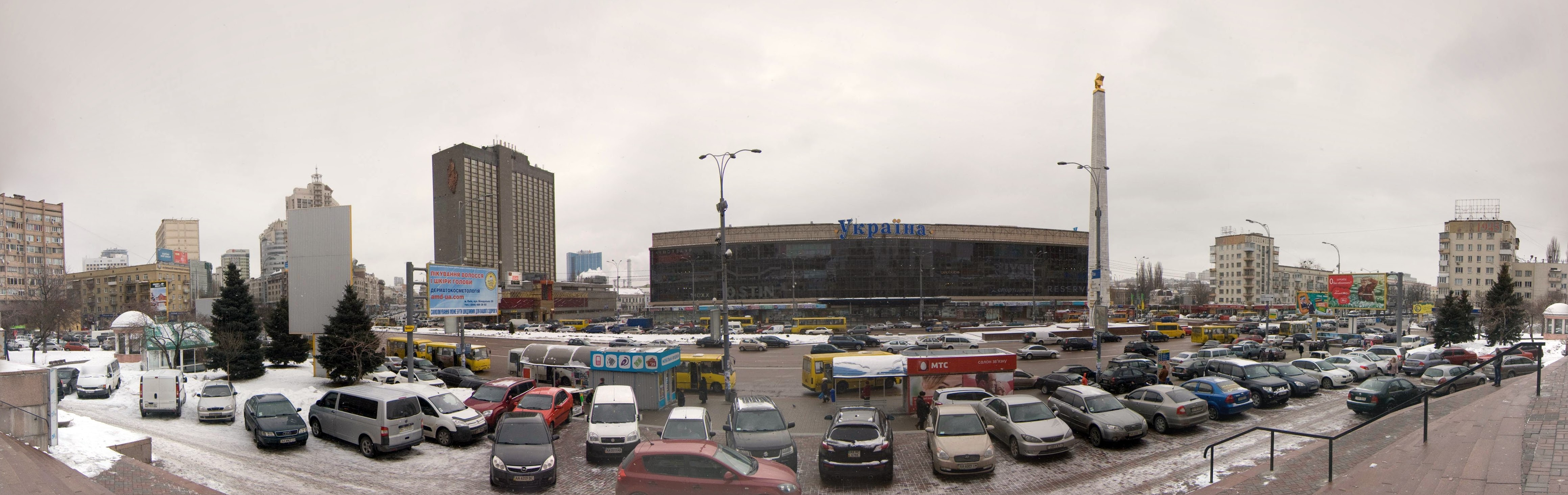
Panorama (southward)

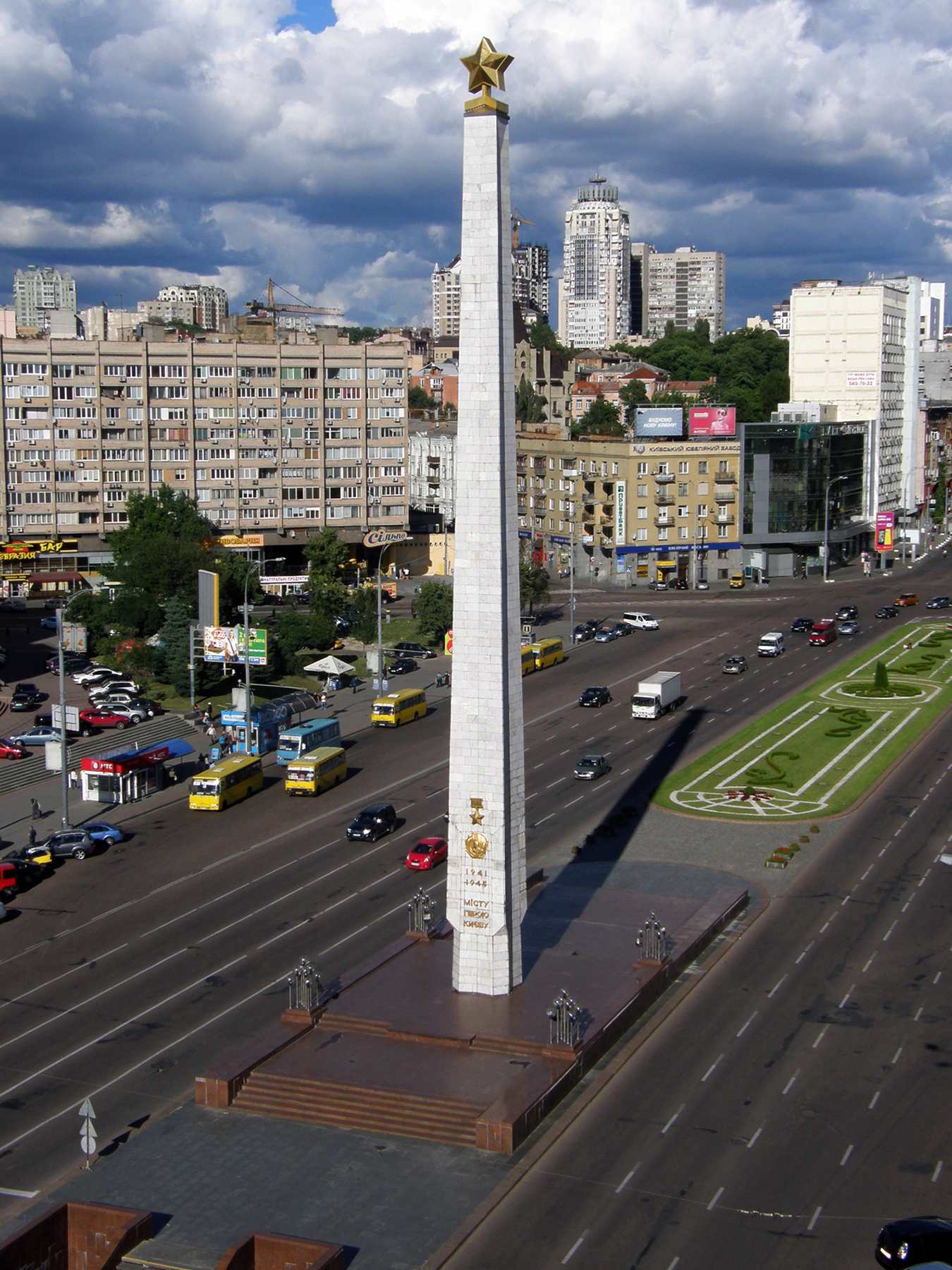
The Victory obelisk (focused); the Soviet medals still visible on this 2014 photo were removed in September and November 2023

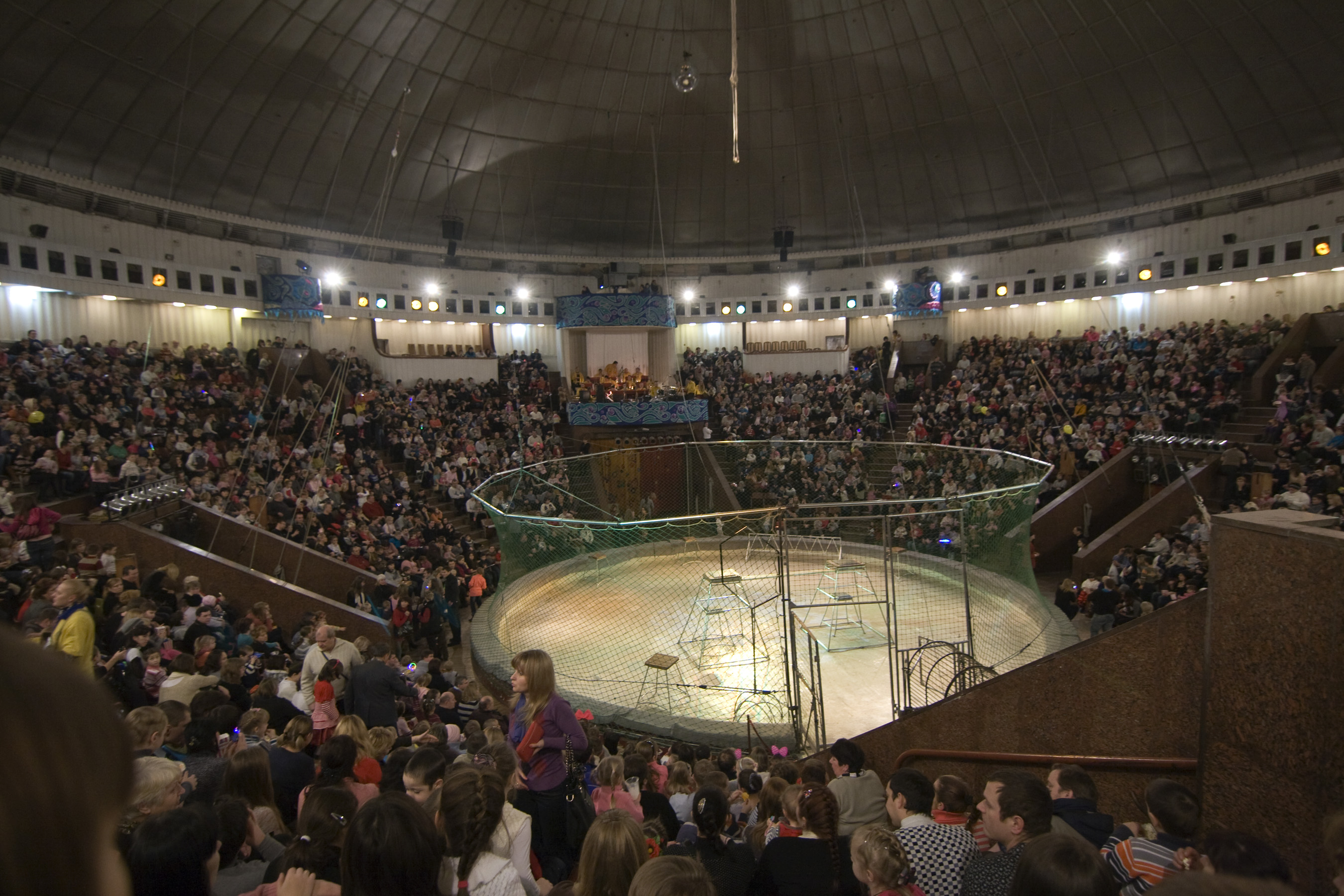
The Kyiv circus (main stage)

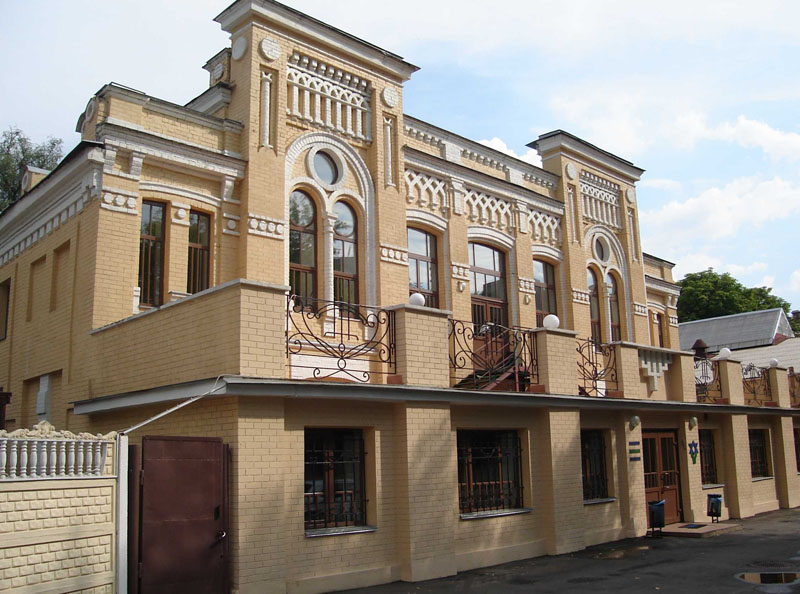
Halytska Synagogue located in the vicinity of the square
