= Hero City of Ukraine =

Honorary title for cities in Ukraine

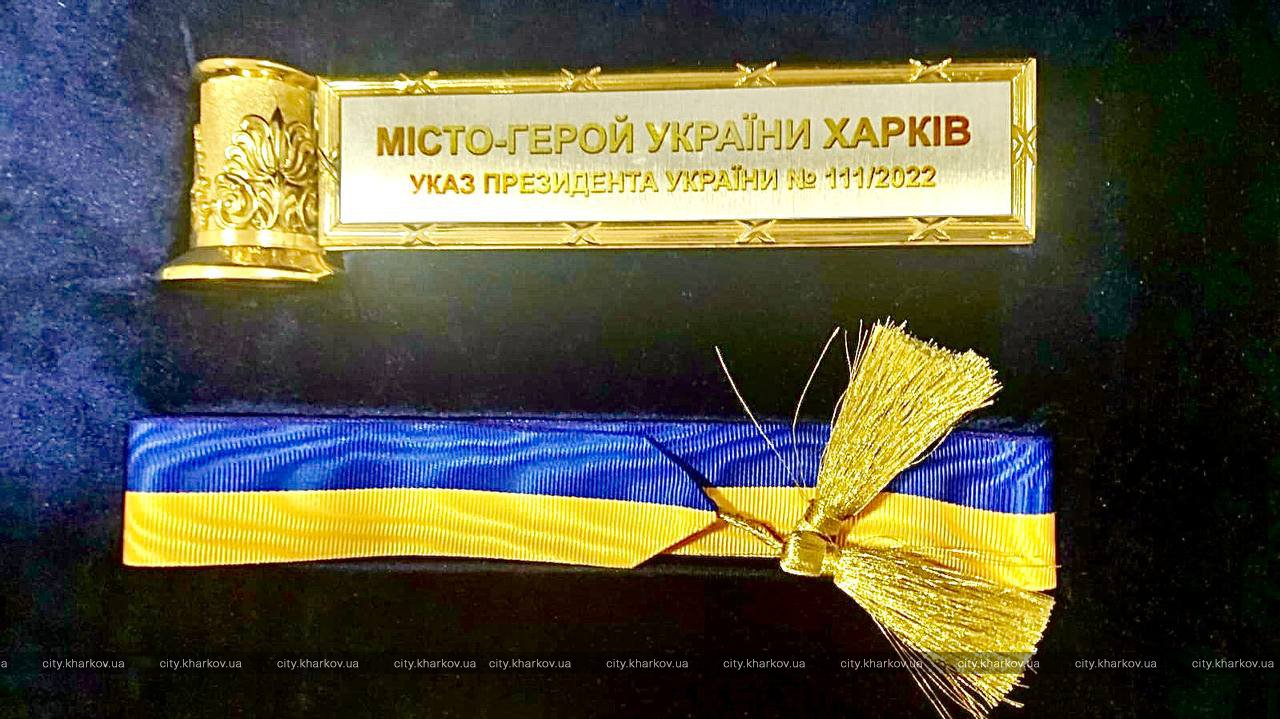
Symbols of the honorary title of Hero City of Ukraine: a hero ribbon and a bar for city flag.

Hero City of Ukraine (Ukrainian: Місто-герой України, romanized: Misto-heroi Ukrainy, IPA: [ˈmisto ɦeˈrɔj ʊkrɐˈjinɪ]) is a Ukrainian honorary title awarded for outstanding heroism during the Russian invasion of Ukraine. It was awarded to ten cities in March 2022. In October 2025 it was awarded to 16 more cities. This symbolic distinction for a city corresponds to the distinction of Hero of Ukraine awarded to individuals.

== History ==
The modern title of Hero City of Ukraine was introduced on March 6, 2022, by decree No. 111 of 2022 by President Volodymyr Zelenskyy following the 2022 Russian invasion of Ukraine. The award is related to the modern Ukrainian title of the Hero of Ukraine. In a public broadcast, Zelenskyy stated:

"I decided to mark our Hero Cities with a special title that already existed. When another invasion was defeated. But a similar invasion. Another invasion. But no less cruel invasion."

In addition to renewing the status of Kyiv, Odesa, Sevastopol and Kerch, decree 111 also awarded the title to the cities of Chernihiv, Kharkiv, Kherson, Mariupol, Volnovakha, and the rural settlement of Hostomel.

On March 24, 2022, Zelenskyy gave the title of Hero City to another 4 cities by decree No. 164/2022, namely: Bucha, Irpin, Okhtyrka and Mykolaiv.

On October 1, 2025, the title was granted to 16 more cities: Bashtanka, Druzhkivka, Huliaipole, Kostiantynivka, Kramatorsk, Kupiansk, Marhanets, Nikopol, Orikhiv, Pavlohrad, Pokrovsk, Sloviansk, Starokostiantyniv, Sumy, Trostianets, and Voznesensk.

== List of Hero Cities announced in March 2022 ==
=== Chernihiv ===
– Siege of Chernihiv

The siege of Chernihiv was launched on February 24, 2022, by Russian forces. According to the British Ministry of Defence, Russian forces had failed to capture the city and instead opted to bypass the city through an alternative route to Kyiv. Ukrainian officials reported that the Russian forces were heading towards the nearby towns of Sedniv and Semenivka. Ukrainian military forces reportedly captured significant numbers of Russian equipment and documents. The siege was relieved on March 31.

=== Hostomel ===
– Battle of Antonov Airport and Battle of Hostomel

The Battle of Antonov Airport began on February 24, 2022, during the 2022 Russian invasion of Ukraine. While initial assaults from Russian Airborne VDV units were repulsed by Ukrainian Forces, the airport eventually fell on February 25 following a second wave of forces.

The Antonov An-225 Mriya, the world's largest airplane, was at the airport at the time of the opening phase of the battle. It was initially confirmed to be intact by an Antonov pilot, despite the fighting. However, on February 27, Ukrainian officials reported that the Mriya had been destroyed by a Russian airstrike. On March 4, Russian state-owned television channel Channel One Russia aired footage showing that the Mriya had been destroyed. By April 2, the Russian army retreated and Hostomel was retaken by Ukrainian troops.

=== Kharkiv ===
– Battle of Kharkiv (2022)

The battle of Kharkiv began on February 24. Kharkiv, located just 32 kilometres (20 mi) south of the Russia–Ukraine border and a predominately Russian-speaking city, is the second largest city in Ukraine and was considered a major target for the Russian offensive from its onset. The stiff Ukrainian resistance, though, meant that the Russian advance to that city would end in failure, and the battle ended on May 14 with all Russian forces withdrawn from the city towards the Russian border. The battle has been described by a Ukrainian presidential advisor as the "Stalingrad of the 21st century."

=== Kherson ===
– Battle of Kherson

The Battle of Kherson began on February 24, 2022, with Russian Ground units as well as Airborne Forces launching an attack from the Crimean Peninsula, crossing the Dnieper River and capturing the city itself on March 2, 2022. Kherson was the first major Ukrainian city captured by Russian forces in the 2022 Russian invasion of Ukraine. By 11 November, Russian forces withdrew from the city and Ukrainian troops hoisted the Ukrainian flag in the city. Paolo Gentiloni, EU Commissioner for the Economy, said commenting on a video on the liberation celebrations: "Kherson, the only capital occupied by the Russian invasion, has been liberated. So peace is closer."

=== Mariupol ===
– Siege of Mariupol

The Siege of Mariupol was a military action in Ukraine during the 2022 Russian invasion of Ukraine, when forces from Russia and the separatist Donetsk People's Republic (DPR) engaged Ukrainian forces in the city of Mariupol. The battle, which was part of the Russian Eastern Ukraine offensive, started on February 24, 2022, and concluded on May 20, 2022, when Russia announced the remaining Ukrainian forces in Mariupol surrendered after they were ordered to cease fighting.

=== Volnovakha ===
– Battle of Volnovakha

The Battle of Volnovakha was initiated on February 25, 2022, by Russian and DPR forces as part of the Eastern Ukraine offensive of the 2022 invasion of Ukraine. The battle resulted in the capture of the city on March 12, 2022, by DPR forces. The governor of Donetsk Oblast, Pavlo Kyrylenko stated that the city had been largely destroyed. The Associated Press independently confirmed that the town had been captured by pro-Russian separatists and much of it had been destroyed in the fighting.

=== Irpin ===
– Battle of Irpin

The Battle of Irpin began on February 27, 2022, with Russian Ground units entering the city. They captured half of the city by March 14. The town was retaken by the UGF on March 28 after a month-long battle.

=== Bucha ===
– Battle of Bucha

The Battle of Bucha began on February 27, 2022, with Russian Ground Forces units entering the city. The town was retaken by Ukrainian forces on March 31 after another month-long battle. Following Russian withdrawal, evidence of mass graves dug in the town revealed that during the battle, war crimes were perpetrated against the town's population, as well as Ukrainian soldiers. Known as the Bucha massacre, it was perpetrated by personnel within RGF units stationed within the city as well as associated paramilitaries. The revelations of the murders of the town's residents during the brief Russian occupation of the town by RGF servicemen before its liberation by the Armed Forces of Ukraine shocked the international community.

=== Okhtyrka ===
– Battle of Okhtyrka

The Battle of Okhtyrka began on February 24, 2022, with Russian Ground units trying to enter the city. By 26 March, Russian forces withdrew from the city, but bombardments continue. Okhtyrka survived the shelling of a military unit, the destruction of a thermal power plant, the dropping of three vacuum bombs, and shelling by missiles and aircraft.

=== Mykolaiv ===
– Battle of Mykolaiv

The Battle of Mykolaiv began on February 26, 2022, with Russian Ground units trying to enter the city. On 8 April, Russian forces were repulsed from the city, but bombardments continued on until the liberation of Kherson.

== Map ==
Hero Cities of Ukraine

== See also ==
- Hero City (Soviet Union)
- Hero City monument, Kyiv, a Soviet-era Hero City monument in Kyiv, decommunized in 2023
- Rescuer City
