= Hero City monument, Kyiv =

Soviet victory memorial in Kyiv, Ukraine

Coordinates: 50.4470°N 30.4916°E

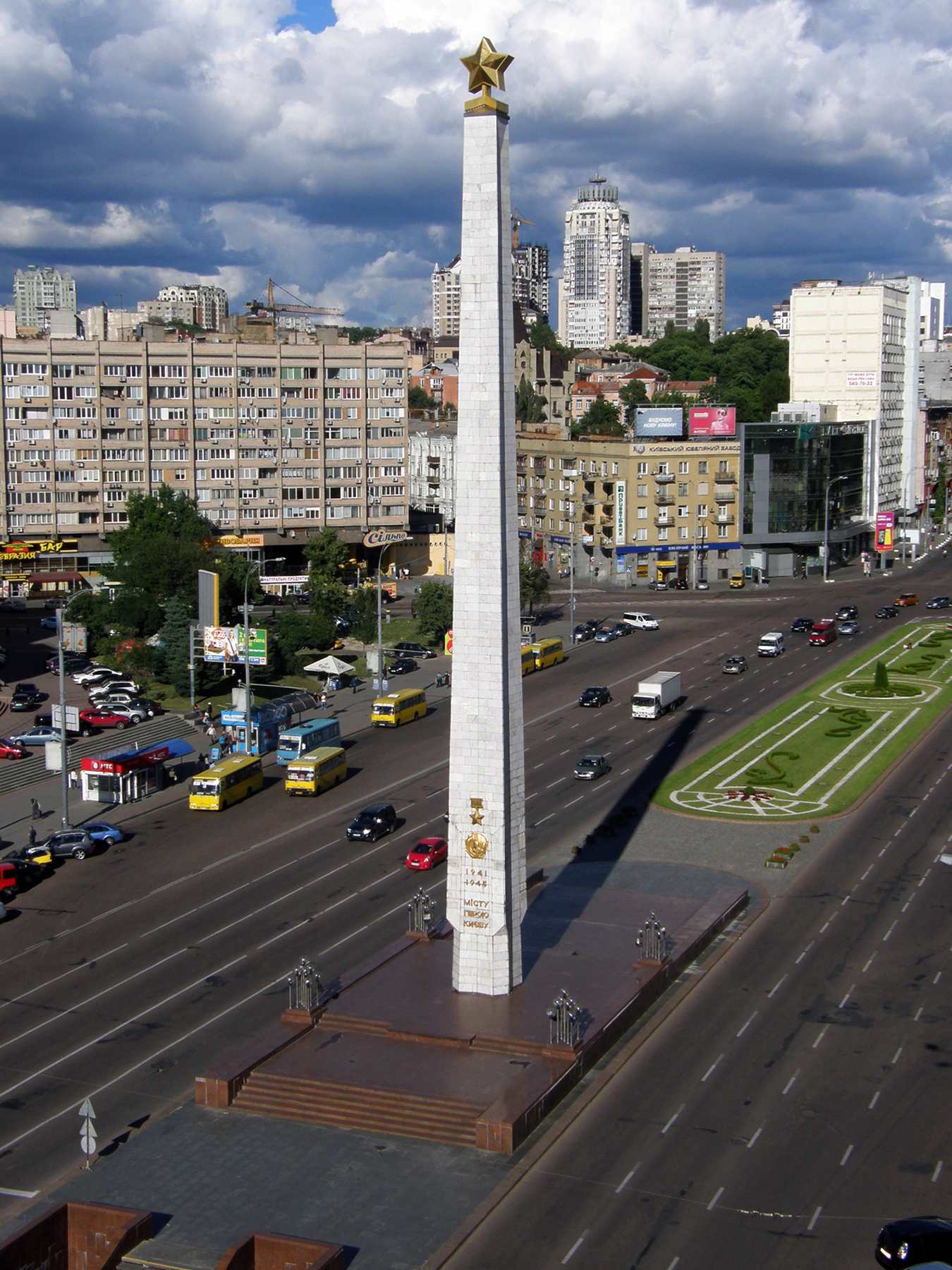
The Hero City monument, Kyiv, photographed in 2014

The Hero City monument (officially, the Obelisk in honor of the hero city of Kyiv, Ukrainian: Обеліск на честь міста-героя Києва, romanized: Obelisk na chest mista-heroia Kyieva) is a World War II memorial in Halytska Square in Kyiv, Ukraine.

It is a 30 m-tall (98 ft) obelisk that was erected in 1982, during the Ukrainian Soviet Socialist Republic. In its original form it was marked with the dates "1941" and "1945", the starting and ending dates of World War II according to the Soviet Union, and featured a "hero star" reflecting Kyiv's status as a Soviet Hero City.

== History ==
Since the Revolution of Dignity in 2014 the Ukrainian authorities have been decommunizing Ukraine's Soviet-era monuments, in a process which has been accelerated following the 2022 Russian invasion of Ukraine.

On 9 February 2023, Kyiv city council renamed the square back from its Soviet-era name of Victory Square to its original name Halytska Square.

On 15 September 2023, the Soviet stars were removed from the obelisk, together with the annotation board in the Russian language, and the "1941" marking was changed to "1939" to match the official Ukrainian date for the start of World War II. On 4 November 2023 the communist star on top of the monument was also removed.

== See also ==
- Mother Ukraine, a monumental Soviet-era statue in Kyiv
- Alley of the Hero Cities, another Hero Cities monument in Kyiv
- Hero City of Ukraine, a post-2022 designation by the Ukrainian government
